There are 15,074 documented lakes in Wisconsin. Of these, about 40 percent have been named. They range in size from small one-and two-acre ponds to  Lake Winnebago. Lake Winnebago is the largest lake by volume and the lake with the longest shoreline, if you ignore Lake Michigan and Lake Superior. The largest man-made lake is Petenwell Lake, which was created by damming the Wisconsin River. Vilas County has the most lakes (1,318) and Brown and Outagamie counties the fewest (4). Many lakes have the same names, with 116 named Mud Lake.

Great Lakes 
 Lake Michigan (extends into Illinois, Indiana, and Michigan)
 Lake Superior (extends into Michigan, Minnesota, and Ontario)

Inland lakes 
Named inland lakes are listed below. Alternate names are indicated in parentheses.

Adams County 

 Amey Pond
 Arkdale Lake (Millpond)
 Arrowhead Lake (Manchester)
 Big Roche A Cri Lake
 Fawn Lake
 Camelot Lake
 Castle Rock Lake
 Crooked Lake
 Deep Lake
 Easton Lake
 Fenner Lake (Fenners)
 Friendship Lake (Millpond)
 Goose Lake
 Jordan Lake (Long)
 Kilbourn Flowage
 McCall Lake
 Mason Lake
 McDougall Lake
 McGinnis Lake
 Parker Lake
 Patrick Lake
 Peppermill Lake (Beaver Pond)
 Roller Lake
 Petenwell Lake
 Sherwood Lake (Deer Lodge)
 Silver Lake
 Wolf Lake

Ashland County 

 Alex Pond
 Augustine Lake
 Bad River Slough
 Bass Lake
 Bay Spring
 Bear Lake
 Beaver Lake
 Beaver Lake
 Beaver Lake
 Beaverdam Lake
 Big Bay Lagoon - Madeline Island
 Black Lake (Birch)
 Blueberry Lake
 Bog Lake
 Bullhead Lake
 Butternut Lake
 Cammerer Lake
 Camp Four Lake
 Caroline Lake
 Conley Lake
 Cranberry Lake
 Cub Lake
 Cycle Lake
 Day Lake Flowage
 Dead Horse Slough
 Ditmans Lake
 Dollar Lake
 Dry Lake
 Duck Lake
 English Lake
 Eureka Lake
 Galilee Lake
 Gates Lake
 Gilbert Lake
 Gordon Lake
 Hay Lake
 Hoffman Lake
 Honest John Lake
 John Frank Lake
 Kakagon Slough
 Kempf Springs
 Kenyon Springs
 Knab Lake
 Lindbergh Lake
 Little Butternut Lake
 Little Clam Lake
 Long Lake (Leland)
 Long Lake
 Loon Lake
 Lost Lake
 Luebke Lake
 Mc Laren Lake (McLarens)
 McCarthy Lake
 Meder Lake
 Meyer Lake
 Mineral Lake
 Moquah Lake
 Mud Lake (Gormely)
 Murphy Lake
 Muskellunge Lake
 Parker Lake
 Pelican Lake
 Pictured Rock Lake
 Pole Lake
 Potter Lake
 Seagels Lake
 Seitz Lake (Sietz, Sitz)
 Sells Lake
 Slim Lake
 Snoose Lake (Snooze)
 Snowshoe Lake (Billard)
 Spider Lake
 Spillerberg Lake
 Sugarbush Lake
 Summit Lake
 Tea Lake
 Three, Lake
 Torrey Lake
 Trout Lake
 Twin Lake, East
 Twin Lake, West
 Twin Lakes, East
 Twin Lakes, West
 Upper Clam Lake
 White River Flowage
 Wolf Lake
 Wolfs Pond
 Woodtick Lake
 Zielke Lake

Barron County 

 Anderson Lake
 Bailey Lake
 Barron Flowage No. 1
 Barron Flowage No. 2
 Barron Flowage No. 3
 Bass Lake
 Bass Lake
 Bass Lake
 Bass Lake
 Bear Lake
 Beauty Lake
 Beaver Dam Lake
 Big Dummy Lake
 Big Moon Lake
 Blueberry Lake
 Bowman Lake
 Buck Lake
 Bullhead Lake
 Butternut Lake
 Cameron Flowage
 Chain Lake
 Chain Lakes
 Chetek Lake
 Couderay Lake
 Cranberry Lake
 Crooked Lake
 Crystal Bay Lake
 Crystal Lake
 Dallas Flowage
 Deep Lake
 Deer Lake
 Desair Lake
 Devils Lake, Lower
 Devils Lake, Upper
 Dietz Lake No. 1
 Dietz Lake No. 2
 Dietz Lake No. 3
 Dietz Lake No. 4
 Duck Lake
 Echo Lake
 Elbow Lake
 Firetag Lake
 Fish Lake
 Fox Lake
 Gates Lake
 Ginder Lake
 Goose Lake
 Granite Lake
 Greely Lake
 Hemlock Lake
 Hillman Lake
 Hogback Lake
 Horseshoe Lake
 Horseshoe Lake
 Johnnys Lake
 Kelleys Lake
 Kelly Lake
 Kidney Lake
 Kirby Lake
 Kirby Lake
 Lake of the Woods (Bass)
 Little Bass Lake
 Little Butternut Lake
 Little Dummy Lake
 Little Granite Lake
 Little Lake
 Little Moon Lake
 Little Sand Lake
 Little Silver Lake
 Long Lake
 Long Lake
 Loon Lake
 Lower Vermillion Lake
 Minnow Lake
 Mitchell Lake
 Montanis, Lake
 Moon Lake
 Moose Ear Lake
 Mud Lake
 Mud Lake (Ojaski)
 Mud Lake
 Mud Lake
 Mud Lake
 Mud Lake
 Musket Lake (Mosquito)
 North Lake
 Old Mill Pond
 Pea Viner Lake
 Peterson Lake
 Pickerel Lake
 Pine Lake
 Pokegama Lake
 Poskin Lake
 Prairie Farm Flowage
 Prairie Lake
 Red Cedar Lake
 Redman Lake
 Rice Lake
 Robinson Lake
 Round Lake
 Round Lake
 Sand Lake
 Scott Lake
 Shallow Lake
 Silver Lake
 Skinaway Lake
 Spider Lake
 Spirit Lake, Lower
 Spirit Lake, Upper
 Spring Lake
 Staples Lake
 Stump Lake
 Sweeny Pond
 Sylvan Lake (Pipe)
 Tenmile Lake
 Thirty, Lake
 Thompson Lake
 Turtle Lake, Lower
 Turtle Lake, Upper
 Tuscobia Lake
 Upper Vermillion Lake
 Waterman Lake, Lower
 Waterman Lake, Upper
 Wickerts Lake
 Wildcat Lake

Bayfield County 

 Adeline Lake
 Ahmeek Lake
 Anderson Lake
 Angus Lake
 Anodanta Lake (Bass Lake No 4)
 Armstrong Lake
 Arrowhead Lake (Bass Lake No 3)
 Atkins Lake
 Bailey Lake
 Balsam Pond
 Bark Bay Slough
 Barnes Lake
 Bass Lake (Pike Chain)
 Bass Lake
 Bass Lake
 Bass Lake
 Bass Lake
 Bass Lake
 Bass Lake
 Basswood Lake
 Bear Lake
 Bear Pond
 Bearsdale Springs, Lower
 Bearsdale Springs, Upper
 Beaver House Lake
 Beaver Lake
 Beaver Lake
 Bell Lake (Belle)
 Bellevue Lake (Long)
 Bibon Lake (Flag)
 Big Brook Lake
 Birch Lake (Emerson No. 2)
 Birch Lake
 Birch Lake
 Bismarck Lake
 Bladder Lake (Kransz)
 Blazer Creek Springs
 Blue Lake
 Bog Lake
 Bony Lake
 Boris Lake
 Breakfast Lake
 Broadax Lake
 Buck Lake
 Buffalo Lake
 Bufo Lake
 Bullhead Lake
 Bullhead Lake
 Bullhead Lake
 Buskey Bay
 Cabin Lake (Cable)
 Cable Lake
 Camp Eleven Lake
 Camp Lake
 Camp Nine Lake
 Camp One Lake
 Camp Two Lake (Buck)
 Camp Two Lake
 Canthook Lake
 Carroll Lake
 Carson Pond
 Casper Lake (Hoof)
 Cat Lake
 Chelonia Lake (Flakefjord)
 Chippewa Lake
 Cisco Lake (First Bass)
 Claire Lake
 Clay Lake
 Club Lake
 Coburn Lake
 Coffee Lake
 Connor Lake
 Cranberry Lake
 Cranberry Lake
 Cranberry Lake
 Crane Lake
 Crooked Lake
 Crystal Lake
 Crystal Lake
 Crystal Lake
 Davis Lake, East
 Davis Lake, West (Osborn)
 Dawn Lake
 Dechamps Creek Spring
 Deep Lake
 Deep Lake
 Deer Lake
 Dells Lake
 Delta, Lake
 Devils Lake
 Diamond Lake
 Dinner Camp Lake
 Drummond Lake
 Dry Well Lake
 Ducetts Lake
 Duck Lake
 Duck Lake
 Eagle Lake (Murray, Inch)
 Eau Claire Lake, Lower
 Eau Claire Lake, Middle
 Eau Claire Lake, Upper
 Egg Lake
 Eighteenmile Creek Spring
 Eightmile Lake, East
 Eightmile Lake, West
 Eko Lake
 Ellison Lake
 Emerson Lake (Emerson No. 4)
 Erick Lake
 Esox Lake (Bass)
 Everett Lake
 Evelyn Lake (Perry)
 Finger Lake
 Fire Lake
 Fish Creek Flowage
 Fish Creek Spring
 Five Island Lake
 Five, Lake (Fifth)
 Flakefjord Lake (Chelonia)
 Flynn Lake
 Flynn Lake
 Frels Lake (Emerson No. 1)
 Friedbauer Lake
 Frog Lake
 Fuller Lake
 George Lake
 Getsey Lake
 Ghost Lake
 Hadley Lake
 Half Moon Lake
 Half Moon Lake (Millpond)
 Hammil Lake (Hammel)
 Happles Lake
 Hart Lake (Heart, Wiehe)
 Hay Lake
 Hay Lake
 Heart Lake
 Henderson Lake
 Henry Lake
 Hicks Lake
 Hidden Lake
 Hildebrand Lake (Emerson No. 3)
 Hildur Lake (Bluebird)
 Hobbs Lake
 Hoist Lake
 Hollibar Lake
 Holly Lake
 Holmes Lake
 Honey Lake
 Horseshoe Lake
 Horseshoe Lake
 Hostrawser Lake
 Hyatt Spring
 Idlewild Lake
 Inch Lake
 Indian Lake
 Iron Lake
 Iron River Flowage
 Island Lake
 Island Lake
 Jackman Lake
 Jackson Lake
 Jesse Lake
 Joann Lake
 Johnson Lake
 Johnson Springs
 Jones Lake
 Kelly Lake
 Kern Lake
 Knotting Lake (Aqua)
 Lake R
 Lake Sixteen
 Lamereau Lake
 Lee Lake
 Lemon Lake
 Lenawee Lake
 Lerche Lake
 Lester Lake
 Lindgren Lake
 Line Lake
 Little Bass Lake
 Little Hidden Lake
 Little Island Lake
 Little Rosa Lake
 Little Siskiwit Lake
 Little Star Lake
 Lizzie Lake (Davis)
 Long Lake
 Long Lake
 Loon Lake
 Lost Creek Slough
 Lost Lake
 Louise Lake
 Lund Lake
 Marengo Lake
 McCarry Lake
 McCloud Lake (McLeod)
 McGinnis Lake
 Mill Pond Lake (Rust Flowage)
 Millicent Lake (Pike)
 Mimi Lake
 Mirror Lake
 Mirror Lake
 Moon Lake
 Moose Lake
 Moreland Lake
 Motyka Lake
 Mountain Lake
 Muck Lake
 Muck Lake
 Mud Flat Lake
 Mud Lake
 Mud Lake
 Mud Lake
 Mullenhoff Lake
 Muskellunge Lake (Butte)
 Muskie Springs Lake (Bear Paw, Ethel)
 Mystery Lake
 Namekagon Lake (Spring, Garden)
 Nancy Lake
 Nelson Lake
 Nestle Lake
 Nokomis, Lake
 North Porter Lake
 Northeast Lake
 Nymphia Lake (Numphia)
 Ole Lake
 Ole Lake
 Olson Lake
 Orienta Flowage
 Osborn Lake
 Overby Lake (Blaisdell)
 Owen Lake
 Pacwawong Lake
 Patsy Lake
 Patsy Lake
 Perch Lake
 Perch Lake
 Perch Lake
 Perry Lake
 Peterson Lake
 Phantom Lake (Pantheon)
 Physa Lake
 Pickerel Lake
 Picture Lake (Pitcher)
 Pigeon Lake
 Pike Lake
 Pine Lake
 Pine Lake
 Planorbis Lake
 Pond Lake
 Pond Lake
 Porcupine Lake
 Pot Lake
 Pre-Emption Creek Pond
 Price Lake
 Priest Lake
 Rainbow Lake
 Rana Lake
 Range Line Lake
 Ree, Lake
 Reynard Lake
 Rib Lake
 Richardson Lake
 Robinson Lake
 Rock Lake
 Roger Lake
 Roger Lake
 Rosa Lake
 Russell Lake
 Ruth, Lake
 Ryberg Lake
 Sage Lake
 Samoset Lake (N Bass)
 Sand Bar Lake
 Sand Lake
 Sawdust Lake
 Sawmill Lake
 Shunenberg Lake
 Shunenberg Springs
 Siegal Lake
 Silver Lake
 Silver Sack Lake
 Simpson Lake
 Siskiwit Lake
 Siskiwit Springs
 Sixteen Lake
 Smear Lake
 Smith Lake
 South Porter Lake
 Southwest Lake (South)
 Spider Lake
 Spider Lake
 Spirit Lake
 Spring Lake
 Spring Lake
 Spruce Lake
 Spruce Lake
 Square Lake
 Star Lake
 Steckbaur Lake
 Steelhead Lake (Ell)
 Stewart Lake
 Stratton Ponds
 Summit Lake
 Swede Lake
 Swett Lake (Sweet)
 Tahkodah, Lake (East)
 Tank Lake
 Tank Lake
 Tars Pond
 Taylor Lake
 Tea Cup Lake
 Tomahawk Lake
 Toothpick Lake
 Topside Lake
 Totagatic Lake
 Tower Lake
 Trail Lake (Emerson No. 5)
 Trapper Lake
 Travers Lake
 Trout Lake
 Tub Lake
 Turtle Lake
 Twin Bear Lake (Crow)
 Twin Lake
 Twin Lake, East
 Twin Lake, North
 Twin Lake, Northeast
 Twin Lake, Northwest
 Twin Lake, South
 Twin Lake, Southeast
 Twin Lake, West
 Two Lake
 Wabigon Lake (Hubigoon)
 Wanoka Lake
 Wentzel Lake
 West Lake
 West Lake
 White Bass Lake
 Wilderness Lake
 Wiley Lake
 Wilipyro Lake (Whipfast, Wiparo)
 Wishbone Lake
 Wolf Lake
 Wright Lake

Brown County 
 Bay Beach Lagoons
 Harbor Lights Lake
 Lilly Lake
 Middle Lake
 Third Lake

Buffalo County 
 Bensel Pond
 Black Lake
 Duck Lake (Bennetts)
 Lizzie Pauls Pond
 Mirror Lake
 Rainbow (Gilmanton Pond)
 Stump Lake

Burnett County 

 Ann Lake
 Austin Lake
 Baker Lake
 Baker Lake
 Baker Lake
 Banach Lake (Kiezer)
 Barrens Springs No. 1
 Barrens Springs No. 2
 Bartash Lake
 Bashaw Lake
 Bass Lake
 Bass Lake
 Bass Lake
 Bass Lake
 Bass Lake
 Bass Lake
 Bass Lake
 Bass Lake
 Bass Lake
 Behr Lake
 Benoit Lake
 Berg Lake
 Big Bear Lake
 Big Doctor Lake
 Big McKenzie Lake
 Big Sand Lake
 Birch Island Lake
 Black Lake
 Blomberg Lake (Bloomberg)
 Bluff Lake
 Bogey Lake
 Boner Lake
 Bradley Lake
 Bricher Lake
 Briggs Lake
 Buck Lake
 Buck Lake
 Buffalo Lake
 Burlingame Lake
 Cadotte Lake
 Chase Lake
 Clam Lake, Lower
 Clam Lake, Upper
 Clam River Flowage
 Clear Lake
 Clubhouse Lake
 Conners Lake
 Corwick Lake
 Cranberry Lake
 Cranberry Lake
 Cranberry Lake
 Crescent Lake
 Crooked Lake
 Crooked Lake
 Crystal Lake
 Culbertson Lake
 Culbertson Springs
 Dahlberg Lake
 Danbury Flowage
 Deep Lake
 Deer Lake
 Des Moines Lake (Sucker)
 Devils Lake
 Doctor Lake
 Dogtown Springs
 Dubois Lake
 Dunham Lake
 Durand Lake
 Eagle Lake
 Eagle Lake
 Echo Lake
 Elbow Lake
 Falk Lake
 Fawn Lake
 Fenton Lake
 Fern Lake
 Ferry Lake
 Fish Lake
 Fish Lake
 Freedom Lakes
 Fremstadt Lake
 Frog Lake (Prinel, Prinell)
 Gabrielson Lake (Gabelson)
 Gaslyn Lake
 Glendenning Lake
 Godfrey Lake
 Goose Lake
 Grass Lake
 Green Lake
 Greenwood Lake
 Gull Lake
 Ham Lake
 Hanscom Lake
 Hayden Lake
 Holmes Lake
 Horseshoe Lake
 Hunters Lake
 Indian Lake
 Isaac Lake
 Island Lake
 Johnson Lake
 Johnson Lake
 Kapes Lake (Miller)
 Keizer Lake
 Kent Lake
 Kreiner Lake
 Lang Lake
 Lang Lake, North
 Larson Lake
 Lily Lake
 Lily Lake
 Lind Lake
 Lindy Lake
 Lipsett Lake (Lipsie)
 Little Bass Lake
 Little Bass Lake
 Little Trade Lake
 Little Bass Lake
 Little Bear Lake
 Little Deer Lake
 Little Dunham Lake
 Little Holmes Lake
 Little Mallard Lake
 Little McGraw Lake
 Little Round Lake
 Little Wood Lake
 Little Yellow Lake
 Lone Star Lake (Saunders)
 Long Lake
 Long Lake
 Long Lake
 Loon Lake
 Loon Lake
 Lost Lake
 Lost Lake
 Lost Lake
 Love Lake
 Lucerne Lake
 Mallard Lake
 Mallard Slough
 McElroy Lake
 McGraw Lake
 McKenzie Lake, Middle
 Meeker Run Lake
 Memory Lake
 Minerva Lake
 Mingo Lake
 Miniature Lake
 Minnow Lake
 Mollete Lake
 Money Lake
 Monson Lake
 Mud Hen Lake
 Mud Lake
 Mud Lake
 Muskrat Lake
 Myre Lake
 Myrick Lake
 Mystery Lake
 Nicaboyne Lake (Nicahoyne)
 No Mans Lake
 North Lake
 Oak Lake
 Our Lake
 Owl Lake
 Peacock Lake
 Perch Lake
 Peterson Lake
 Peterson Lake (Big)
 Phantom Flowage
 Phernetton Lake
 Pickle Lake
 Pike Lake
 Pine Lake
 Pine Lake
 Places Lake
 Point Lake
 Pokegama Lake
 Poquettes Lake (Little Long)
 Pratt Lake
 Prinel Lake (Frog)
 Put Lake
 Rahn Lake
 Rice Lake
 Rice Lake
 Rice Lake
 Richart Lake
 Robie Lake
 Rohr Lake
 Rooney Lake
 Round Lake
 Round Lake
 Round Lake
 Saginaw Lake
 Sand Lake
 Sand Lake
 Sanks Lake
 Shallow Lake
 Shoal Lake
 Silver Lake
 Silver Lake
 Smith Lake
 Spencer Lake (Spence)
 Spirit Lake
 Spook Lake
 Spring Brook Springs
 Spring Lake (Clam River Springs)
 Staples Lake
 Stone Lake
 Stulen Lake
 Sunfish Lake
 Swamp Lake
 Swamp Lake
 Tabor Lake (Loon)
 Tamarack Lake
 Tanda Lake
 Taylor Lake
 Temple Lake
 Thatcher Lake
 Thirty-Two Lake
 Tomoe Lake
 Trade Lake, Big (Little Trade)
 Tucker Lake
 Twenty-Six Lake
 Twenty-Six Lake Springs
 Twin Lake, Lower
 Twin Lake, North
 Twin Lake, South
 Twin Lake, Upper
 Viola Lake
 Ward Lake
 Warner Lake
 Webb Lake (Web)
 Wilson Lake
 Wood Lake
 Yellow Lake

Calumet County 
 Becker Lake
 Brillion Quarry Lake
 Boot Lake
 Chilton Millpond
 Grass Lake
 Hayton Pond
 Round Lake
 Schildhauer Pond
 Lake Winnebago

Chippewa County 

 Ace in the Hole Lake
 Axhandle Lake
 Barr Lake
 Bass Lake
 Bass Lake
 Bass Lake
 Bass Lake
 Bass Lake
 Bass Lake
 Bass Lake
 Bass Lake
 Beaver Lake (Big Beaver)
 Beaver Lake
 Beaver Lake
 Big Buck Lake
 Big Twin Lake
 Birch Creek Flowage No. 1
 Birch Creek Flowage No. 2
 Black Lake
 Bob Lake
 Bog Lake
 Boiler Lake
 Boot Lake
 Bradley Lake
 Burnt Wagon Lake
 Cadott Flowage
 Cadotte Lake
 Calkins Lake
 Calkins Lake, North
 Calkins Lake, West
 Cameron Lake (La Rose)
 Camp Lake
 Cather Lake
 Cedar Lake
 Chain Lake
 Chapman Lake
 Chick Lake
 Chick Lake
 Chippewa Falls Flowage
 Clear Lake
 Clear Lake
 Como, Lake (Bloomer Mill Pond)
 Cornell Flowage
 Cornell Lake
 Dam Lake
 Dark Lake
 Dark Lake
 Deer Lake
 Dog Island Lake
 Dorothy Lake
 Dumke Lake
 Eagle Lake
 Evans Lake
 Evergreen Lake
 Finley Lake
 Firth Lake
 Fishpole Lake
 Foster Lake
 Fur Farm Lake
 Glen Loch Flowage
 Granger Lake
 Hallie, Lake
 Hartnan Lake
 Harwood Lake No. 1
 Harwood Lake No. 2
 Harwood Lake No. 3
 Harwood Lake No. 4
 Hay Lake
 Hay Meadow Flowage No. 1
 Hay Meadow Flowage No. 2
 Hay Meadow Flowage No. 3
 Hay Meadow Flowage No. 4
 Hemlock Lake
 Henneman Lake
 Highland Lake
 Himple Lake
 Hodge Lake (Lake Harriet)
 Holcombe Flowage
 Horseshoe Flowage
 Horseshoe Lake
 Horseshoe Lake
 Horseshoe Lake
 Howe Lake
 Jacks Lake
 Jeanstow Lake
 Jerome Lake
 Jim Lake
 Kettle Lake
 Knickerbocker Lake
 Larrabee Lake
 Leo Joerg Lake
 Little Bass Lake
 Little Beaver Lake
 Little Bob Lake
 Little Buck Lake
 Little Pine Lake
 Little Plummer Lake
 Little Twin Lake
 Logger Lake
 Long Lake
 Long Lake
 Long Lake
 Loon Lake
 Lost Lake
 Lowland Lake
 Marsh-Miller Lake (Mill Pond)
 Mary Jane Lake No. 1
 Mary Jane Lake No. 2
 McDonald Lake
 Meadows Lake
 Metcalf Lake
 Miller Lake
 Moon Lake
 Mud Lake
 Mud Lake
 Mud Lake
 No. 1 Lake
 No. 1 Lake
 No. 2 Lake
 No. 3 Lake
 No. 4 Lake
 No. 5 Lake
 North of North Shattuck Lake
 Nut Lake
 Odd Lake
 Old Abe Lake
 Oliver Lake No. 1
 Oliver Lake No. 2
 Oliver Lake No. 3
 Otter Lake (Brown)
 Parker Lake
 Pauls Lake
 Payne Lake
 Pheffercorn Lake
 Pickerel Lake
 Pickerel Lake
 Picnic Lake
 Pike Lake
 Pine Lake
 Planning Lake
 Plummer Lake
 Popple Lake
 Popple Point Lake
 Rassmusson Lake
 Rat Lake
 Rattz Lake
 Raven Lake
 Riley Lake
 Robinson Lake
 Rock Lake
 Rock Lake
 Roedecker Lake (Bass)
 Roger Lake No. I
 Rogers Lake No. 2 (Duck)
 Round Lake
 Round Lake
 Ruby Lake
 Salisbury Lake
 Sand Lake
 Schoolhouse Lake
 Shattuck Lake, North
 Shattuck Lake, South
 Silver Bass Lake
 Silver Lake
 Silver Lake
 Smith Lake
 Snake Lake
 Spence Lake
 Spring Creek Flowage No. 1
 Spring Creek Flowage No. 2
 Spruce Lake
 Stanley Lake
 Star Lake
 Star Lake
 Sunfish Lake
 Sunfish Lake
 Tallman Lake (Siphon)
 Tamarack Lake
 Tamarack Lake
 Taylor Lake (Rat)
 Tilden Mill Pond
 Town Line Lake
 Tram Lake
 Triple Lake, East
 Triple Lake, North
 Triple Lake, West
 Turk Lake
 Turtle Lake
 Twin Lake, East
 Twin Lake, West
 Two Island Lake
 Upper Twin Lake
 Weeks Lake, East
 Weeks Lake, West
 Wesley Lake
 West Lake
 Willow Creek Flowage
 Wissota, Lake
 Withrow Lake
 Worden Lake

Clark County 

 Abbot Ranch Flowage
 Arbutus Lake
 Beaver Flowage
 Carter Pool
 Dorchester Park Pond
 Emerson Lake (Humbird Pond)
 Granton Park Pond
 Iron Run Flowage
 Mead Lake
 Neillsville City Pond
 Owen Pond
 Rock Dam Lake (Hay)
 Sherwood Lake
 Simes Creek Flowage (Willow)
 Snyder Lake
 Sportsman Lake
 Spruce Lake

Columbia County 

 Alder Pond
 Becker Lake (Paynes Pond)
 Columbia Lake
 Corning Lake
 Crystal Lake
 Crystal Lake
 Curtis Lake
 Dates Millpond
 Figors Mill Flowage
 French Creek WLA Pool No. 1
 French Creek WLA Pool No. 2
 George Lake
 Goose Lake
 Kilbourn Flowage
 Lantz Pond
 Lazy Lake (Fall R Millpond)
 Long Lake
 Lost Lake (L Hollow)
 Mud Lake
 Park Lake
 Pickerel Lake
 Ryan Pond
 Silver Lake
 Spring Lake
 Swan Lake
 Tarrant Lake
 Weeting Lake
 West Lake
 Wisconsin Lake
 Wyona Lake (Wyocena Millpond)

Crawford County 
 Clear Lake
 Columbus Lake
 Garnet Lake
 Gordons Bay
 Gremore Lake (Courtois Pond)
 Lake Winneskiek
 Marais Lake
 McGregor Lake
 Spring Lake (Sioux Bayou)

Dane County 

 Barney Lake
 Bass Lake
 Brandenburg Lake (Katrine)
 Cherokee Lake
 Cherokee Marsh
 Crystal Lake
 Fish Lake
 Goose Lake
 Goose Pond
 Grass Lake
 Grass Lake
 Harriett Lake
 Hook Lake
 Indian Lake
 Kegonsa Lake
 Koshkonong Lake
 Lake Belle View (Belleville Millpond)
 Marshall Millpond
 Mendota Lake
 Monona Lake
 Morse Pond
 Mortenson Pond
 Mud Lake (Marx Pond)
 Mud Lake
 Mud Lake, Lower (Mud)
 Mud Lake, Upper
 Rice Lake
 Rockdale Millpond (Camrock)
 Salmo Pond (Raemisch Pond)
 Springfield Pond
 Stewart Lake
 Stoughton Millpond
 Stebbingville Pond
 Sweet Lake
 Turtle Lake
 Verona Gravel Pit (Palmers Pond)
 Virgin Lake (Hull Pond)
 Waubesa Lake
 Windsor Lake
 Wingra Lake

Dodge County 

 Alderley Millpond
 Beaver Dam Lake
 Chub Lake
 Collins Lake (Little Mud)
 Crystal Lake
 Danville Millpond
 Emily Lake
 Fox Lake
 Horicon Marsh Pond
 Kekoskee Millpond
 Lomira Pond
 Lost Lake
 Lowell Millpond
 Mayville Pond, Lower
 Mayville Pond, Upper
 Mud Lake
 Neosho Mill Pond
 Sinissippi Lake (Hustisford)
 Theresa Millpond

Door County

Douglas County 

 Alexander Lake
 Amnicon Lake
 Anderson Lake
 Apple Lake
 Arrowhead Lake (Beglinger)
 Bass Lake
 Bass Lake
 Bear Lake
 Beaupre Springs
 Beauregard Lake
 Bennett Lake
 Bergen Creek Springs
 Big Lake
 Big Spring
 Bird Sanctuary Lake
 Black Fox Lake
 Black Lake
 Blue Springs
 Bluegill Lake
 Bond Lake
 Boot Lake
 Breitzman Lake
 Buckley Spring
 Buffalo Lake
 Catherine Lake
 Cedar Island Ponds
 Chain Lake, Lower
 Chain Lake, Upper
 Cheney Lake
 Clear Lake
 Clyde Lake
 Coffee Lake
 Cranberry Creek Flowage
 Cranberry Lake
 Cranberry Spring
 Cream Lake
 Crooked Lake
 Crotty Lake
 Crystal Lake
 Deer Lake
 Deer Lake
 Deer Lake
 Deer Print Lake
 Dowling Lake
 Eau Claire Lake, Lower
 Eau Claire River Flowage
 Ellison Lake
 Ferguson Lake
 Flamang Lake
 Flat Lake
 Gander Lake
 Gilbert Lake
 Glacier Lake (Round)
 Goose Lake
 Grover Lake
 Harriet Lake
 Haugen Lake (Pagan)
 High Life Lake
 Hoodoo Lake
 Hopkins Lake
 Horseshoe Lake (Tank)
 Horseshoe Springs
 Interfalls Lake (Manitou)
 Island Lake
 Jack Pine Lake
 Kreide Lake (Two Mile)
 Lake of the Woods
 Leader Lake
 Little Sand Lake
 Little Simms Lake
 Little Steele Lake
 Long Lake
 Long Lake
 Long Lake
 Loon Lake (Spook)
 Loon Lake
 Loon Lake
 Lucius Lake
 Lund Lake
 Lydon Lake
 Lyman Lake
 Lynch Spring
 McDougal Springs
 McGraw Lake
 Metzger Lake
 Mills Lake
 Minnesuing Lake
 Minnow Lake
 Minong Flowage (Lake Nancy)
 Mirror Lake
 Moose Branch Flowage
 Moose Lake
 Muck Lake
 Muck Lake
 Mud Creek Springs
 Mud Lake
 Mud Lake
 Mulligan Lake
 Murray Lake
 Muskrat Lake
 Nebagamon Lake
 Newman Lake
 One Buck Lake
 One Mile Lake
 Ox Lake, Lower
 Ox Lake, Upper
 Paradise Lake
 Park Creek Pond
 Person Lake
 Peterson Lake
 Pickerel Lake
 Pine Lake
 Plate Lake
 Poplar River Pond
 Radigan Flowage
 Rainbow Lake
 Red Lake
 Reichuster Lake
 Rock Lake
 Round Lake
 Rush Lake
 Sand Lake
 Saunders Pond
 Sauntrys Pocket
 Sawyer Lake
 Scott Lake
 Scout Lake
 Seventeen Lake
 Shoberg Lake
 Simms Lake
 Smith Lake
 Snake Lake
 Snipe Lake
 Spider Lake
 Spring Lake
 St Croix Flowage (Gordon)
 Steele Lake
 Sullivan Lake
 Sunfish Lake (Redding)
 Swenson Lake
 Thorn Lake
 Three Buck Lakes, Lower
 Three Buck Lakes, Middle
 Three Buck Lakes, Upper
 Twin Lakes, East
 Twin Lakes, North
 Twin Lakes, South
 Twin Lakes, West
 Two Mile Lake (Halfway)
 Upper St Croix Lake
 Wagner Lake
 Wascott Lake
 Webb Lake
 Whiskey Lake
 Whitefish Lake (Bardon, Bee)
 Whiteside Lake
 Wilson Lake
 Yoekel Lake (Yokel)

Dunn County 
 Blakely Lake
 Big Lake
 Eau Galle Lake
 Elk Creek Lake
 Menomin Lake
 Mirror Lake
 Old Elk Lake
 Rock Falls Millpond
 Sneen Lake
 Tainter Lake

Eau Claire County 
 Altoona Lake
 Cooley Lake
 Coon Fork Flowage
 Dells Millpond (Rodell)
 Dells Pond
 Eau Claire Lake
 Elk Creek Lake
 Fairchild Pond
 Fall Creek Pond
 Halfmoon Lake
 Powell Lake (Powers, Wilson)

Florence County 

 Anna Lake
 Baird Lake
 Bass Lake
 Bass Lake
 Bass Lake
 Bass Lake
 Bass Lake, West
 Bell Lake
 Bessie Babbet Lake (Grass)
 Birch Lake
 Boot Lake (Shadow)
 Brule River Flow
 Buckskin Lake
 Bush Lake (Twin, Happy)
 Camp Thirteen Lake
 Cosgrove Lake (Railroad)
 Cruiser Lake
 Dorothy Lake
 Duck Lake
 Duck Lake
 East Lake (Spread Eagle Chain)
 Edith Lake
 Elwood Lake
 Emily Lake
 Fay Lake
 Fischer Lake
 Fisher Lake
 Frog Lake
 Grandma Lake
 Grass Lake (Little Grass)
 Grubhoe Lake
 Haley Lake
 Halls Lake
 Halsey Lake
 Hauserman Lake
 Hegstrom Lake
 Hemlock Lake
 Hord Lake (Mud, Sand)
 Hoskin Lake
 Jaquet Lake
 Johnson Pond
 Jutra Lake
 Keyes Lake
 Kieper Lake
 Kingsford Flowage
 Lake of Dreams
 Lake Seventeen
 Lauterman Lake
 Lilly Lake (Spread Eagle)
 Little Boot Lake (Shadow)
 Little Emily Lake
 Little Porcupine Lake
 Little Van Zile Lake
 Long Lake
 Long Lake (Spread Eagle)
 Loon Lake
 Lost Lake
 Lund Lake (Bush)
 Marm Lake
 Middle Lake (Spread Eagle Chain)
 Mirror Lake
 Montgomery Lake
 Morgan Lake
 Mud Lake
 Mud Lake
 Mud Lake
 Mud Lake
 Mud Lake
 Mud Lake
 No Bottom Lake
 Nona Lake
 North Lake (Spread Eagle Chain)
 Olson Lake (Walden Pond)
 Patten Lake
 Perch Lake
 Pickerel Lake
 Pine River Flowage
 Porcupine Lake
 Price Lake
 Railroad Lake (Spread Eagle Chain)
 Reisner Lake
 Riley Lake, North (Lt Riley)
 Riley Lake, South
 Robago Lake
 Sand Lake
 Sand Lake
 Savage Lake (Three)
 Scout Lake (Happy)
 Sea Lion Lake
 Seidel Lake
 Sevenmile Lake (Mud)
 Silver Dollar Lake
 South Lake (Spread Eagle)
 Spring Lake
 Spruce Lake
 Twin Falls Flowage
 Van Zile Lake
 West Lake  (Spread Eagle Chain)
 Wheeler Lake
 Whisker Lake
 Wisconsin Slough
 Wolf Pond
 Woods Creek Pond

Fond du Lac County 

 Auburn Lake (Lake Fifteen)
 Bernice Lake
 Buttermilk Lake
 Butzke Lake
 Campbellsport Millpond
 Cedar Lake
 Crooked Lake
 Deneveu Lake
 Devils Lake
 Dickman Lake
 Fairwater Pond
 Forest Lake
 Giltners Lake
 Kettle Moraine Lake (Round)
 Little Mud Lake
 Long Lake
 Mallard Hole Lake
 Mauthe Lake (Moon)
 Mischos Pond
 Mud Lake
 Mullet Lake
 Paulys Lake
 Raspberry Lake
 Ripon Pond (Gothic)
 Rush Lake
 Senn Lake
 Spring Lake
 Spruce Lake
 Tittle Lake
 Twin Lakes
 Waupun Lake
 Lake Winnebago
 Wolf Lake

Forest County 

 Arbutus Lake
 Atkins Lake (Mud)
 Bailey Lake
 Bass Lake
 Bastile Lake
 Bear Lake
 Big Cub Lake
 Birch Lake
 Bishop Lake
 Blantons Spring
 Bluegill Lake
 Bobs Lake
 Bogbrook Impoundment
 Bogbrook Lake (Riggs)
 Bose Lake
 Bradley Lake
 Briss Lake
 Brule Springs
 Bug Lake
 Butternut Lake
 CC Pond
 Camp One Spring
 Camp Six Lake
 Camp Three Lake
 Cavour Lake
 Charlie Otto Spring
 Chuks Lake
 Clark Lake
 Clear Lake
 Cloud Lake
 Cook Lake (Popple)
 Crane Lake
 Crawford Lake
 Crystal Lake
 Curve Lake (Horseshoe)
 Dawson Lake
 Deep Hole Lake
 Deep Lake
 Deer Lake Flowage
 Deer Lake
 Deer Lake
 Devils Lake
 Donut Lake
 Duck Lake
 Echo Lake
 Eds Lake
 Eugene Lake
 Evergreen Lake
 Finnerty Lake
 First Small Lake, East
 First Small Lake, West
 Forest Lake (Mud)
 Four Ducks Lake
 Franklin Lake
 Furbush Lake
 Gem Lake
 Gertrude Lake
 Goose Lake
 Gordon Lake
 Grass Lake
 Ground Hemlock Lake
 Ham Lake
 Hardwood Lake
 Harmony Lake
 Harriet Lake (Stella, Still)
 Hay Meadow Flowage
 Hilbert Lake (Orwig)
 Hiles Mill Pond
 Himley Lake (Leech)
 Hoffman Spring
 Horseshoe Lake
 Horseshoe Lake
 Howell Lake (Silver)
 Indian Camp Lake
 Indian Lake
 Indian Springs (Riley Springs)
 Johnson Spring
 Johnson Springs
 Julia Lake
 Jungle Lake
 Kaine Lake
 Kazmier Lake
 Kentuck Lake
 Kimberly Lake
 King Lake
 Kohlhoff Lake
 Langer Lake (Chums)
 Lartsch Lake
 Laura Lake
 Lily Lake
 Lily Pad Lake
 Lily Pad Lake
 Little Birch Lake (Riley, Mud)
 Little Cub Lake
 Little Long Lake
 Little Pine Lake
 Little Pine Lake
 Little Popple Lake (Duck)
 Little Rice Lake
 Little Riley Lake
 Little Sand Lake
 Little Star Lake
 Little Wapoose
 Logger Lake
 Lone Wolf Lake (Wolf)
 Long Lake
 Lost Lake
 Lost Lake
 Lake Lucerne (Stone)
 Ludington Lake
 Luna Lake (Loon)
 Mainline Lake (Mud, White)
 Marsh No. Ten Lake
 Marshall Lake
 Marshall Lake, Lower
 May Lake
 Mayflower Lake
 Mayflower Lake
 McKinley Lake
 Metonga Lake
 Midget Lake
 Mole Lake
 Mud Lake No. 1
 Mud Lake No. 2
 Mud Lake
 Mud Lake
 Mud Lake
 Nelligan Pond
 Ninemile Lake, Upper
 Oak Lake
 Onimish Lake (Animush)
 Otter Lake
 Otter Springs
 Pat Shay Lake (Shay)
 Peanut Lake
 Peshtigo Lake
 Pickerel Lake
 Piledriver Lake
 Pine Lake
 Popple Lake
 Purdy Lake (Purdue)
 Quartz Lake (Crystal)
 Ramsdell Lake
 Range Line Lake
 Rat Lake
 Rat Lake
 Revolver Lake
 Rice Lake
 Richardson Lake
 Riley Lake
 Ritter Lake
 Robbins Lake (Lost, Elm)
 Roberts Lake
 Robinson Lake
 Rogers Lake
 Ross Lake
 Round Lake
 Roxy Lake
 Scattered Rice Lake
 Scott Lake (Lane)
 Seal Lake
 Second Small Lake
 Sevenmile Lake
 Shabodock Lake
 Shelp Lake (Bass)
 Shiner Lake
 Shoe Lake
 Silver Lake
 Skunk Lake
 Spring Lake
 Spring Lake
 Spring Pond
 Spring Pond
 St Johns Lake
 Stevens Lake
 Sunfish Lake
 Surprise Lake
 Tee Lake
 Three Johns Lake
 Torpee Spring No. 1
 Torpee Spring No. 2
 Trump Lake
 Turtle Lake
 Two Dutchman Lake
 Two Sisters Lake, North
 Two Sisters Lake, South
 Valley Lake
 Van Zile Lake
 Wabikon Lake
 Waite Lake
 Walsh Lake (Mud)
 Wapoose Lake
 White Deer Lake
 Whiteye Lake (Loon)
 Windfall Lake
 Wolf Lake
 Woodbury Lake
 Woods Lake
 Wyman Lake
 Zarling Lake (Mud)
 Zieler Springs

Grant County 

 Bertom Lake
 Big Cat Slough
 Bullhead Slough
 Coalpit Slough
 Crooked Slough
 Dead Lake
 Dixon Lake
 Ferry Lake
 Fish Trap Lake
 Glen Lake
 Jones Slough (WI River oxbow)
 Long Slough
 McCartney Lake
 Mt Hope Rearing Pond
 Oleart Lake
 Poffenrath Slough
 Pospichal Slough
 Postel Slough
 Rice Lake
 Sand Cut
 Walnut
 Whites Slough
 Woodman Lake

Green County 
 Albany Lake (Millpond)
 Beckman Lake
 Decatur Lake
 Lake Montesian
 Zanders Lake

Green Lake County 
 Big Twin Lake
 Dog Lake
 Grand Lake (Millpond)
 Grand River Marsh
 Green Lake (Big Green)
 Heart Lake
 Little Green Lake
 Little Twin Lake
 Manchester Millpond
 Maria Lake
 Puckyan Millpond
 Puckaway Lake
 Spring Lake
 Spring Lake (Spirit)

Iowa County 
 Avoca Lake
 Birch Lake
 Blackhawk Lake
 Cox Hollow Lake
 Goodwiler Lake
 Halverson Lake
 Helen Lake
 Kendall Lake
 Long Lake
 Ludden Lake
 Taliesin Lake
 Twin Valley Lake

Iron County 

 Allen Lake
 Altman Lake
 American Lake
 Barbara Lake
 Barrel Spring Lake
 Bass Lake
 Bass Lake
 Bass Lake, North
 Bass Lake, South
 Bear Lake
 Bearskull Lake
 Beaver Lake
 Beaver Lake
 Belding Lake
 Big Pine Lake
 Birch Lake
 Black Lake
 Bluegill Lake
 Boot Lake
 Brandt Lake
 Brandt Lake
 Brush Lake (Hawkins)
 Camp 12 Lake
 Cap Henry Lake
 Caroline Lake
 Catherine Lake
 Cedar Lake
 Charnley Lake
 Cille Lake
 Clear Lake
 Courtland Lake
 Cramer Lake
 Cranberry Lake
 Cranberry Lake
 Creeds Flowage
 Crystal Lake
 Cub Lake
 Davis Lake (Feeley, Lost)
 Dead Horse Lake
 Deer Lake
 Deertail Lake (Cirilli)
 Dollar Lake
 Dorothy Lake
 Doud Lake
 Du Page Lake
 Duck Lake
 Duck Lake
 Dumbbell Lake
 Echo Lake
 Emerson Lake
 Ess Lake
 Evelyn Lake
 Fat Lake
 Fawn Lake
 Feely Lake
 Ferry Lake
 Fierek Lake
 Fifteen Lake
 First Black Lake
 Fisher Lake
 Flannagan Lake
 Fox Lake
 French Lake
 Frog Lake
 Geyser Lake
 Gile Flowage
 Goose Lake
 Grand Portage Lake
 Grant Lake (Riley)
 Grant Lake, North
 Grey Lake (Gray)
 Harper Lake
 Hawk Lake
 Hay Creek Flowage
 Hay Lake
 Hazel Lake
 Hewitt Lake
 Hill Lake
 Hobbs Lake
 Horseshoe Lake (Mud)
 Hourglass Lake
 Island Lake
 Island Lake
 Jankewitz Lake
 Jeannie Lake (Clear)
 Judd Lake
 Julia Lake
 July Lake
 June Lake
 Kelly Lake
 Keough Lake
 Kinder Lake (Spruce, Bass)
 Krupka Lake
 Kyle Lake
 Lac de Beaumont
 Lake of the Falls
 Lake One (Hall)
 Lavina Lake
 Leach Lake
 Lehto Lake (Norma)
 Lipp Lake
 Little Bear Lake
 Little Cap Henry Lake
 Little Martha Lake
 Little Moose Lake
 Little Muskie Lake
 Little Oak Lake
 Little Oxbow Lake
 Little Pike Lake
 Little Pine Lake
 Little Turtle Flowage
 Long Lake
 Lost Lake
 Lost Lake
 Maki Lake
 Margaret Lake
 Martha Lake
 Marty Lake (Swamp)
 May Lake
 McCarthy Lake
 McDermott Lake
 Mercer Lake
 Minette Lake (L Bass, Spruce)
 Minnow Lake
 Mirror Lake (Sardine)
 Moose Lake
 Mud Lake
 Mud Lake
 Munnomin Lake (Jesse)
 Muskie Lake
 Mystery Lake
 Negani Lake (Hegani)
 Net Lake
 Nine Lake
 Nokomis Lake
 Norma Lake
 Norway Pine Lake
 Oak Lake
 Obadash Lake
 Obrien Lake
 One Man Lake
 Oriole Lake
 Otter Lake
 Otter Lake
 Owl Lake
 Oxbow Lake
 Pardee Lake
 Paul Lake
 Payment Lake
 Pike Lake
 Pine Lake
 Pine Lake, North
 Plantation Lake
 Pleasant Lake
 Plunkett Lake (Sugar)
 Popko Lake
 Pork
 Randall Lake
 Randall Lake, West
 Reimer Lake, East
 Reimer Lake, West (Perch)
 Reservation Line Lake
 Rice Lake
 Rice Lake
 Roberts Springs
 Ruby Lake
 Ruth Lake
 Sack Lake
 San Domingo Lake
 Sand Lake
 Sandy Beach Lake
 Saskatoon Lake
 Saxon Falls Flowage
 Second Black Lake
 Sells Lake
 Seven Acres Lake
 Shay Lake
 Sherman Lake (Lost)
 Shine Lake
 Shirley Lake
 Sister Lake, North
 Sister Lake, South
 Six, Lake
 Smith Lake
 Snowshoe Lake, North
 Snowshoe Lake, South
 Spider Lake (Whispering Pines)
 Spinnet Lake
 Spring Lake
 Springstead Lake, Lower
 Springstead Lake, Upper
 Stone Lake
 Superior Falls Flowage
 Swamp Lake
 Tahoe Lake
 Tamarack Lake (Notter)
 Teal Lake (Burns)
 Ten Lake
 Third Black Lake
 Thomas Lake
 Townline Lake
 Trap Lake
 Trude Lake
 Turtle-Flambeau Flowage
 Twin Lake
 Twin Lake, East
 Twin Lake, East
 Twin Lake, North
 Twin Lake, South
 Twin Lake, West
 Twin Lake, West
 Upson Lake
 Vincent Lake
 Viola Lake
 Virgin Lake
 Voss Lake
 Wallace Lake
 Weber Lake
 Weber Lake
 Wilson Lake
 Woods Lake
 Woodson Lake

Jackson County 

 Arbutus Lake
 Battle Point Flowage
 Big Bear Flowage
 Big Lake
 Black Duck Flowage
 Black River Flowage
 Charcoal Pond
 Cranberry Flowage, Lower
 Cranberry Flowage, Upper
 Deer Lake
 Douglas Pond
 Dry Land Flowage
 Funmaker Flowage
 Goodyear Lake
 Harkner Flowage
 Hawkins Lake
 Horse Shoe Lake
 Horseshoe Lake
 Ketchum Lake
 Lee Lake
 Little Bear Flowage
 Little Thunder Flowage
 Lower Backwater
 Lower Wilson Marsh Flowage
 Mallard Flowage
 Northfield Lake
 Oakwood Lake  (U Merrillan Pond)
 Oxbow Pond
 Partridge Crop Flowage
 Pigeon Creek Flowage
 Potter Flowage
 Range Line Flowage
 Sawdust Marsh
 Seventeen Flowage
 Sharptail Flowage
 Sherwood Lake
 Levis Flowage
 Staffon Flowage (School)
 Stevens Lake (Miller & Stebbs)
 Tanner Flowage
 Teal Flowage
 Town Line Flowage
 Trow Lake (Lake Merrillan Pond)
 Upper Backwater
 Wazee Lake
 Weber Flowage
 White Tail Flowage
 Wildcat Flowage
 Wilson Marsh Flowage
 Wyman Lake

Jefferson County 

 Bean Lake
 Blue Spring Lake
 Cushman Pond
 Firemen Park Pond
 Golden Lake
 Goose Lake
 Hahns Lake
 Hoopers Millpond
 Hope Lake
 Koshkonong Lake
 Kurtz Pond
 Marsh Lake
 Mud Lake
 Mud Lake
 Mud Lake
 Perch Lake
 Red Cedar Lake
 Ripley Lake
 Rock Lake
 Rome Mill Pond
 Rose Lake
 Round Lake
 Spence Lake
 Spring Lake, Lower
 Spring Lake, Upper
 Watertown Millpond

Juneau County 

 Beaver Flowage
 Big Lake
 Castle Rock Lake
 Decorah Lake
 Eagle Nest Flowage (Potters)
 Goose Pool
 Kilbourn Flowage
 Kingston Flowage
 Lemonweir Millpond
 Meadow Valley Flowage
 New Lisbon Lake
 Orange Millpond
 Petenwell Lake
 Pool #13
 Pool #18
 Pool #19
 Pool #27
 Pool #28
 Rynearson Flowage No. 1
 Rynearson Flowage No. 2
 Sprague-Mather Flowage
 Suk & Cerney Flowage
 Trout Lake

Kenosha County 

 Andrea Lake
 Barber Pond
 Bullfrog Pond
 Bur Oak Lake
 Camp Lake
 Center Lake
 Cross Lake
 Dyer Lake
 East Lake (Vern Wolf Flow)
 Elizabeth Lake (South Twin)
 Flanagon Lake
 Francis Lake (League)
 Friendship Lake (Mud)
 George Lake
 Hooker Lake
 Juniper Lake
 Kull Lake
 Lake Shangrila-Benet (Paschen)
 Lake Benedict
 Lake Mary (Marie Lake)
 Lilly Lake (Leaone)
 Montgomery Lake
 Mud Lake
 Mud Turtle Pond
 Passch Lake
 Paddock Lake
 Paulin Pond
 Peat Lake (Mud)
 Petrified Springs Park Pond
 Powers Lake
 River Oaks Lake
 Rock Lake
 Silver Lake
 Voltz Lake

Kewaunee County 
 Alaska Lake, East
 Alaska Lake, West
 Bruemmerville Pond
 Casco Millpond
 Chada Lake (Chadas)
 Engledinger Lake
 Hallada Lake (Steffel Pond)
 Heidmann Lake (Bolt)
 Krohns Lake
 Little Mud Lake (Red River Swamp)
 Seidl Lake (Seidel)
 Shea Lake
 Stump Pond
 Silver Lake (Sylvan, Hunsader)

La Crosse County 
 French Lake
 Hillview Pond
 Lake Onalaska
 Long Lake
 Neshonoc Lake
 Van Loon Lake
 Veterans Memorial Park Pond

Lafayette County 
 Bloody Lake
 Hidden Valley
 Joy Lake
 Horseshoe Lake
 Yellowstone Lake

Langlade County 

 Ada Lake
 Agnes, Lake
 Airhole Lake
 Alga Lake
 Alta Lake
 Anderson Lake
 Aninnan Lake
 Antigo Lake (Kellog Pond)
 Apple Lake, East
 Apple Lake, West
 Augustyn Springs
 Baker Lake
 Bear Lake
 Beaver Lake
 Bellis Spring
 Berendsen Lake
 Big Twin Lake
 Birch Lake
 Black Oak Lake
 Blue Spring
 Bog Lake
 Bogus Lake
 Borth Lake
 Boulder Lake
 Bullhead Lake
 Camp Lake
 Chisel Spring
 Chub Lake
 Clear Lake
 Clear Lake, Lower
 Clubhouse Springpond
 Crooked Lake
 Crystal Lake
 Dark Lake
 Deadman Lake
 Deep Wood Lake
 Demlow Lake, Lower
 Demlow Lake, Upper
 Denault Spring
 Diene Lake
 Dodge Lake
 Duck Lake
 Duck Pond
 Dynamite Lake
 Eagle Lake
 Eddy Lake
 Elder Lake
 Elton Millpond
 Elton Springpond
 Emil Spring
 Enterprise Lake
 Ethel, Lake
 Evangeline Lake
 Ferguson Pond
 First Lake, Lower
 First Lake, Upper
 Fischer Lake
 Fish Spring
 Flood Spring
 Flood Spring (Seefelts)
 Flora Lake
 Florence Lake
 Florence Lake, East
 Fox Lake
 Gabriel Lake
 Galyan Springs
 Game Lake
 Garski Flowage
 Gilkey Lake
 Glade Lake (Perch)
 Goto Lake
 Greater Bass Lake
 Hanson Flowage
 Harper Lake
 Harper Springs
 Hatton Springs
 Hazel Lake
 Heinz Spring
 Hidden Spring
 High Lake
 High Lake
 High Lake
 Hilger Lake
 Hilson Lake
 Hindu Lake
 Hiwanka Lake, Lower
 Hiwanka Lake, Upper
 Hogelee Sp No. 1
 Hogelee Sp No. 2
 Hoglot Springs
 Hollister Lake
 Homestead Lake
 Horseshoe Lake
 Horseshoe Lake
 Horseshoe Lake
 Indian Lake
 Jack Lake
 Jessie Lake (Kentuck)
 Jordan Lake
 Joyce Lake
 Karbergers Springs
 Kelly Spring
 Kennedy Lake
 Kettle Lake
 Kimball Lake
 King Spring
 Knoke Spring
 Krause Springs
 Lady Lake
 Lawrence Lake
 Learned Lake
 Leonard Nixon Springs
 Lily Springs (Lambert)
 Little Bass Lake
 Little Emil Spring
 Little Partridge Lake
 Little Pike Lake
 Little Rose Lake, East
 Little Rose Lake, Middle
 Little Rose Lake, West
 Little Sand Lake
 Little Twin Lake, Lower
 Little Twin Lake, North
 Little Twin Lake, South
 Little Twin Lake, Upper
 Long Lake
 Long Lake
 Loon Lake
 Lost Lake
 Lost Spring
 Low Lake
 Lower Bass Lake
 Mable Lake
 Marigold Lake
 MarKraf Spring
 Mary Lake
 Maxwell Spring
 McCaslin Spring
 McDonald Lake
 McGee Lake
 Meyer Lake
 Minito Lake
 Miniwakan Lake
 Moccasin Lake
 Moonshine Springs
 Moose Lake
 Moose Springs
 Mud Lake
 Mud Lake
 Mud Lake
 Mueller Lake
 Muskrat Lake
 Nelson Lake
 Neva Lake, North
 Neva Lake, South
 Niobe Lake (Deadman’s)
 Nixon Springs
 Noboken Lake
 Norway Lake
 Obrien Springs, Lower
 Obrien Springs, Upper
 One Island Lake
 One, Lake
 Ormsby Pond
 Otter Lake
 Otter Lake
 Our Lake
 Partridge Lake
 Payne Spring
 Pence Lake
 Perch Lake
 Perch Lake
 Perch Lake
 Perch Lake
 Perch Lake
 Perch Lake
 Perch Lake
 Perch Lake
 Peters Lake
 Phlox Pond
 Pickerel Lake
 Pine Lake
 Pine Springs
 Pohaida Lake
 Poor Farm Spring
 Porkey Lake
 Post Lake, Lower
 Post Lake, Upper
 Punchout Springs
 Rabe Lake
 Rasmussen Spring
 Rogers Lake
 Roix Springs
 Rolling Stone Lake
 Rose Lake (Bear)
 Round Lake
 Saddlebag Lake
 Sasacat Lake
 Saul Spring
 Sawyer Lake (Edith)
 Schmuhl Lake
 Section Ten Lake
 Section Thirty Lake
 Setting Lake
 Shadick Spring
 Shanty Bottom Lake
 Shoestring Lake
 Sipes Spring
 Snag Lake
 Spider Creek Flowage
 Spring Lake
 Spring Lake
 Spring Lake
 East Lake
 Starks Springs
 Stevens Pond
 Stevens Spring
 Stillhouse Springs
 Sucker Lake
 Summit Lake
 Sunfish Lake
 Sunken Lake
 Sunshine Springs
 Susan Lake
 Sylan Lake
 Tekakwitha Lake (Sunken)
 Thompson Lake
 Townline Lake
 Town Line Springs
 Trout Spring
 Turtle Lake
 Twin Hill Lake
 Two Island Lake
 Two, Lake
 Typner Lake
 Tyra Lake
 Ventor Lake (Lower Ventor)
 Ventor Lake, Upper
 Wamin Lake
 Water Power Lake
 West Lake
 White Lake
 Wichser Lake (Bass)
 Willow Springs
 Wolf Lake, Lower
 Wolf Lake, Upper
 Woodduck Springs
 Woods Flowage (Bucks)

Lincoln County 

 Abel Lake
 Ackerman Lake
 Alexander Lake
 Alice, Lake
 Allen Lake
 Ament Lake
 Anderson Lake
 Anient Lake
 Bass Lake
 Bass Lake
 Bass Lake
 Bear Lake
 Bear Lake
 Beaver Lake
 Beaver Lake
 Bennett Lake
 Birch Lake
 Black Alder Lake
 Bog Lake
 Bridge Lake
 Bruce Lake
 Buck Lake
 Bughouse Lake
 Burlock Lake
 Buteau, Lake
 Camp Lake
 Camp Two Lake
 Capitola Lake
 Chain Lake
 Chain Lake, East
 Chain Lake, West
 Clara, Lake
 Clara, Lake
 Clark Lake
 Clear Lake
 Copper Lake
 Coppes Lake
 Crane Foot Lake
 Crystal Lake
 Deer Lake
 Doris, Lake
 Dudley Lake
 Ebert Lake
 Echo Lake
 Extrom Lake
 Fawn Lake
 Fish Lake
 Fox Lake
 Fox Lake
 Frog Lake
 Gerbick Lake
 Ghost Lake
 Gibson Lake
 Gospel Lake
 Grandfather Flowage
 Grandmother Flowage
 Halfmoon Lake
 Harrison Lake
 Hart Lake
 Hat Lake
 Heart Lake
 Henrich Lake
 Henson Lake
 High Lake
 Hilderbrand Lake
 Hilts Lake
 Homestead Lake
 Horgen Lake
 Horn Lake
 Horseshoe Lake
 Jacknife Lake
 Jersey City Flowage
 June Lake
 Kaise Lake
 King Spring
 Kippenberg Spring
 Knight Lake
 Kordick Lake
 Krueger Lake
 LaCerte, Lake
 Larson Lake
 Laurel Lake
 Lily Lake
 Little Pike Lake
 Lokemoen Lake
 Lone Pine Lake
 Long Lake
 Lost Lake
 Lost Lake
 Luecks Lake
 Mable, Lake
 Mary, Lake
 McCarthy Lake
 McGinnis Lake
 Mequithy Lake
 Merrill Flowage
 Miller Lake
 Mirror Lake
 Mist Lake
 Mohawksin, Lake
 Moraine Lake
 Morrison Lake
 Mud Lake
 Mud Lake
 Muskellunge Lake
 Nelson Lake (Fox)
 Nokomis, Lake
 Oak Lake
 Olivotti Lake
 Otter Lake
 Partridge Lake
 Perch Lake
 Pesabic Lake
 Pickerel Lake
 Pickerel Lake
 Pier Lake
 Pine Lake
 Pine Lake
 Posey Lake
 Reno Lake
 Rice River Flowage (Nokomis)
 Road Lake
 Roothouse Lake
 Round Lake
 Seven Island Lake
 Silver Lake
 Skanawan Lake
 Slater Lake
 Smith Lake
 Snake Lake
 Somo Lake
 Spirit River Flowage
 Spring Lake
 Spring Lake
 Wisconsin Lake
 Staub Spring
 Staub Spring, Upper
 Stewart Lake
 Sump Lake
 Swiss Lake
 Tahoe Lake
 Teal Lake
 Thompson Lake
 Triangle Lake
 Tug Lake
 Turtle Lake
 Twin Lake, North
 Twin Lake, South
 Wedlers Pond

Manitowoc County 

 Bergene Lake
 Boot Lake
 Bullhead Lake
 Carstens Lake (Carsten)
 Cedar Lake
 Centerville Flowage
 Clarks Mills Pond
 Eaton Twin Lake, North
 Eaton Twin Lake, South
 English Lake
 Fenske Lake
 Gass Lake
 Glomski Lake
 Graf Lake (Long, Munedowk)
 Grosshuesch Lake
 Harpt Lake (Herman)
 Hartlaub Lake (Hartab)
 Hemptons Lake
 Horseshoe Lake
 Inch Lake
 Karstaedt Lake
 Kasbaum Lake
 Kellners Lake
 Lindeman Lake
 Little Pigeon Lake
 Little Sy Lake
 Long Lake (Big Long)
 Millhome Flowage
 Mott Lake (Motts)
 Mud Lake (Hartmans)
 Neumeyer Lake
 North Lutzke Lake
 Oschwald Lake
 Peterson Lake
 Pigeon Lake
 Prueder Lake (Praeder)
 Quarry Lake
 Ranger Lake
 Rockville Flowage
 Schisel Lake
 Scout Lake
 Shoe Lake
 Shoto Lake
 Silver Lake
 South Lutzke Lake
 Spring Lake (Getchaw)
 Spring Pond
 Steinthal Lake
 Sy Lake
 Teek Lake (Mueller)
 Tuma Lake (Ording)
 Vetting Lake
 Waack Lake
 West Lake
 Weyers Lake
 Wilke Lake

Marathon County 

 Abbotsford Pond
 Bass Lake
 Bear Lake
 Berkhahn Flowage (Townline)
 Big Bass Lake
 Big Eau Pleine Reservoir
 Bluegill Lake
 Boathouse Spring
 Bohnes Lake
 Clark Spring
 Clay Pond (Ringle Lake)
 Crow Lake
 Dubay Lake
 Eau Claire Flowage (Schofield)
 Fisher Flowage
 Fox Lake
 Go-To-It Lake
 Honey Island Flowage
 Honey Island Flowage, North
 Honey Island Flowage, West
 Horseshoe Flowage
 Lilly Lake
 Little Bass Lake
 Little Eau Pleine Flowage
 Little Frog Lake
 Little Lake (Perch)
 Long Lake
 Lost Lake
 Main Flowage
 Mayflower Lake (Sunflower)
 McMillan Pool No. 2
 McMillan Reservoir (Reservoir)
 McMillan WLA Pool No. 6
 Mead WLA Pool No. 10
 Mead WLA Pool No. 5
 Mission Lake (Crooked)
 Moen Lake
 Mosinee Flowage
 Moss Lake (Moss Malls)
 Mud Lake
 Muddy Lake
 Mystery Lake
 Norrie Lake (Go to It)
 Pike Lake
 Rangeline Flowage
 Rice Lake
 Rice Lake, North
 Rice Lake, South
 Smoky Hill Flowage
 Smoky Hill Flowage, North
 Spiegel Spring
 Spring Lake
 Stenson Lake
 Swamp Lake
 Teal Flowage
 Totten Spring
 Townline Flowage, North
 Townline Reservoir
 Turtle Lake
 Wadley Lake (Shantytown)
 Wausau Dam Lake
 Wausau Lake

Marinette County

Marquette County 

 Big Pine Lake
 Bright Lake
 Buffalo Lake
 Burnita Lake (Bullhead)
 Christensen Lake
 Clearwater Lake
 Comstock Lake
 Cotters Lake
 Crystal Lake
 Dagner Lake (Mud)
 Dates Millpond
 Echo Lake
 Echo Lake (Peters)
 Emery Lake  (Emerald, Richards)
 Emrick Lake
 Ennis Lake (Muir)
 Fenner Lake (Fenners)
 Goodhue Lake
 Grand River Marsh
 Harris Pond (Harrisville)
 Imm Lake
 Kilby Lake
 Knights Lake
 Larch Lake
 Lawrence Pond
 Little Lake
 Madden Lake (Thompson)
 Mason Lake
 McCall Lake
 Metcalf Lake (Collins)
 Montello Lake
 Moon Lake (Birch)
 Mud Lake
 Mud Lake
 Mud Lake
 Mud Lake
 Mud Lake (Myers)
 Needham Pond
 Neenah Lake (Oxford Millpond)
 Neshkoro Millpond
 Ogle Lake (Glacier)
 Oxford Lake
 Pine Lake
 Pleasant Lake
 Pollys Lake
 Puckaway Lake
 Sache Pond
 Sandow Lake (Leiske)
 Sandy Lake
 School Section Lake
 Sharon Lake
 Silver Lake
 Smith Lake
 Spring Lake, East
 Spring Lake, West
 Swamp Lake
 Thompson Lake No. 1 (Madden)
 Thompson Lake No. 2 (Madden)
 Thompson Lake No. 3 (Madden)
 Tuttle Lake (Turtle)
 Twin Lake, East
 Twin Lake, West
 Westfield Pond
 White Lake
 Williams Lake
 Wood Lake

Menominee County 

 Bass Lake
 Bass Lake, Lower
 Bass Lake, Upper
 Beauprey Lake
 Beauprey Springs
 Berry Lake
 Big Injun Lake
 Blacksmith Lake
 Brigham Lake
 Burney Lake
 Coon Lake
 Cott Lake
 Crowell Lake
 Crystal Springs Lake
 Deadman Spring
 Elma Lake
 Founder Lake
 Frechette Lake
 Fredenberg Lake
 Grignon Lake
 Hazel Lake
 Hemlock Lake
 Keshena Lake
 La Belle Lake
 La Motte Lake
 La Verne Lake
 Legend Lake
 Little Blacksmith Lake
 Little Sand Lake
 Long Lake (Spirit)
 Marsh Lake
 McCall Lake
 McCall Lake, Lower
 Moshawquit Lake
 Neconish Lake
 Neopit Mill Pond
 Noseum Lake
 Perote Lake
 Pestiga Lake (Peshtigo)
 Pine Lake
 Pine Lake
 Pywaosit Lake
 Red Springs
 Rice Lake
 Round Lake
 Rushes Lake
 Sand Lake
 Sapokesick Lake
 Skice Lake
 Spring Lake
 St Joseph Lake
 Sunia Lake
 Teabeau Lake
 Turtle Lake
 Vejo Lake
 Wahtosah Lake
 Waukau Lake
 Weso Lake

Milwaukee County 

 Boerner Botanical Garden Pond No. 1
 Boerner Botanical Garden Pond No. 2
 Boerner Botanical Garden Pond No. 3
 Brown Deer Park Pond
 Dineen Park Pond
 Dumkes Lake
 Estabrook Park Lagoon
 Grant Park Pond
 Greenfield Park Pond
 Holler Park Pond
 Humboldt Park Pond
 Jackson Park Pond
 Jacobus Park Pond
 Juneau Park Lagoon
 Kelly Lake, Upper
 Koepmier Lake (Bishop)
 Kosciuszko Park Pond
 Linden Pond
 McCarty Park Pond
 McGovern Park Pond
 Menomonee Parkway Pond
 Mitchell Park Pond
 Monastery Lake
 Mud Lake
 New Zoo Pond
 North Golf Course Pond No. 1
 North Golf Course Pond No. 2
 North Golf Course Pond No. 3
 Northridge Lake No. 1
 Northridge Lake No. 2
 Noyes Pond
 Oak Creek Parkway Pond
 Root River Parkway Pond
 Saveland Park Pond
 Schroedel Pond
 Scout Lake
 Sheridan Park Pond
 Ueihlein Pond
 Washington Park Pond
 Whitnall Park Pond
 Wilson Park Pond
 Wood Hospital Pond

Monroe County 

 Alderwood Lake
 Angelo Pond
 Big Sandy Lake
 Cataract Pond
 Deep Lake
 East Silver Lake
 Espe Pond
 Flora Dell Lake
 Hans Beigel Pond
 Hazel Dell Lake
 Lower Sparta Pond
 Monroe County Flowage
 Mud Lake
 North Flowage
 Perch Lake
 Pinnacle Rock Pond
 Ranch Creek Lake (Lost)
 Sandy Lake
 Scott Flowage
 Shallow Lake
 Stillwell Pond
 Suukjak Sep Lake
 Swamp Pond
 Tomah Lake
 Upper Sparta Pond (Sparta)
 Wac Pond
 Water Mill Pond
 Wazeda Lake
 West Sandy Lake
 West Silver Lake

Oconto County 

 Anderson Lake
 Archibald Lake
 Archibald Tower Springs
 Balcom Lake
 Barnes Lake
 Barney Spring
 Bass Lake
 Bass Lake (Wickser)
 Bass Lake
 Bear Lake
 Bear Paw Lake
 Beaver Lake
 Benz Lake
 Berry Lake
 Big Gillett Lake (Gillett)
 Big Island Lake
 Binder Lake
 Birch Lake
 Boot Lake
 Boulder Lake
 Boundary Lake (Bass)
 Bowman Lake
 Brooks Lake
 Buck Lake
 Bullfrog Lake
 Caldron Falls Reservoir
 Camp Five Lake
 Camp Four Lake (Bass)
 Camp Lake
 Cave Lake (Krake, Small Bass)
 Cedar Lake
 Cedar Lake
 Chain Lake
 Chicken Crop Lake (Cave)
 Chicken Foot Lake (Chicken)
 Christie Lake (Christy)
 Chute Pond
 Company Lake
 Cooley Lake
 Crab Lake
 Crooked Lake
 Deadman Lake
 Deep Lake
 Deer Lake
 Dell Lake (Spruce)
 Delzer Lake
 Dollar Lake
 Dombroski Lake (Dombrowski)
 Explosion Lake
 Fanny Lake
 Far Lake
 Farr Lake
 Finnegan Lake
 First Lake
 Flower Lake (Grass)
 Forbes Spring
 French Lake (Shay)
 Frog Lake
 Funk Lake
 Gaffney Lake
 Gilkey Lake
 Glocke Lake (Gluckie)
 Gray Lake (Grey)
 Green Lake
 Grignon Lake
 Grindle Lake (Waupee)
 Hagen Lake (Hogen)
 Halfmoon Lake
 Hells Acre Springs
 Hickey Springs
 Hidden Lake
 Hills Pond
 Hoerth Lake (Herth)
 Holt Lake
 Horn Lake
 Horn Shaped Lake
 Impassable Lake
 Island Lake, Lower
 Island Lake, Upper
 Jocko Lake
 John Lake
 Johnson Lake
 Jones Lake, Lower
 Jones Lake, Upper
 Jones Springs, Lower
 Jones Springs, Upper
 Kathleen Lake (Warder)
 Kelly Lake
 Key Lake (Little Long)
 Klaus Lake
 Kobus Lake
 Krake Lakes
 Kuplie Lake
 Lackawanna Lake (Crystal)
 Lauder Lake
 Ledge Lake (Pine)
 Lily Lake
 Lincoln Lake
 Line Lake
 Little Archibald Lake
 Little Bass Lake
 Little Bear Lake
 Little Gillett Lake
 Little Horn Lake
 Little Maiden Lake
 Little Pickerel
 Little Pickerel
 Marl Lake
 Little Wapato Lake
 Long Lake
 Long Lake
 Lost Lake
 Lost Lake
 Machickanee Flowage (Stiles)
 Maiden Lake
 Makholm Lake (Macholm)
 Marsh Lake
 Mary Lake
 McComb Lake
 Midget Lake
 Miller Lake
 Miriam Lake
 Montana Lake
 Moody Lake
 Mosquito Lake
 Mountain Lake, North (Spruce)
 Mountain Lake, South (Spruce)
 Mud Lake
 Munger Lake
 Nelligan Lake
 Newton Lake (Savage)
 No Mans Lake
 Oconto Falls Pond
 Papoose Lake
 Pat Lake
 Paya Lake
 Pecor Lake (Pecard)
 Perch Lake
 Perch Lake
 Pete Lake
 Peterson Lake
 Pickerel Lake
 Pickerel Lake
 Pine Lake
 Pine Ridge Lake (Long)
 Plantation Lake (Fish, Smoke)
 Ponsegrau Lake
 Porcupine Lake
 Quill Lake (Porcupine)
 Ranch Lake
 Range Lake, Lower
 Range Lake, Upper
 Reader Lake
 Reservoir Pond
 Rost Lake
 Round Lake
 Savage Lake
 Schutt Lake
 Second Lake
 Section Thirty Lake
 Sellin Lake
 Shadow Lake
 Shay Lake
 Shay Lake
 Small Bass Lakes (Cave)
 Smoke Lake
 Spice Lake
 Spies Lake
 Spring Lake
 Spruce Lake
 Messenger Lake
 Star Lake
 Sullivan Springs
 Sunrise Lake (Sand)
 Surprise Lake (Bass)
 Swansons Lake
 Temple Lake
 Townsend Flowage (Wheeler)
 Trout Lake
 Turtle Lake
 Turtle Lake
 Twin Lake, East
 Twin Lake, West
 Ucil Lake (Veil, Herl)
 Underwood Lake
 Valley Lake (Yavell)
 Veil Lake
 Wades Lake
 Wapato Lake, Lower (Poison)
 Wapato Lake, Upper (Poison)
 Warington Lake
 Waubee Lake
 Waupee Flowage
 Waupee Lake
 Wescott Lake
 Westphall Lake
 Wheeler Lake
 White Lake
 White Potato Lake
 Wichser Lake (Bass)
 Winslow Lake (Long)
 Wiscobee Lake
 Yankee Lake

Oneida County

Outagamie County 
 Allerton Lake
 Black Otter Lake (Hortonville)
 Blueberry Lake
 Lake Jerome

Ozaukee County 

 Cedarburg Pond
 Cedarburg Stone Quarry
 Daly Lake
 Donut Lake
 Drzewiceki Lake
 Fromm Pit
 Gough Lake (Little Bienborn)
 Grafton Millpond
 Hanneman Lake (Kuenn)
 Hansen Lake
 Harrington Beach Quarry
 Horn Lake (Big Bienborn)
 Huiras Lake
 Lac Du Cours
 Lime Kiln Millpond
 Long Lake (Mud)
 Ludowissi Lake
 Moldenhauer Lake
 Mud Lake (Long)
 Roeckl Lake
 Spring Lake (Random)
 Thiensville Millpond

Pepin County 
 Chimney Lake
 Dead Lake
 Forty Acre Lake
 Goose Pond
 Lake Pepin
 Schlosser Lake
 Silver Birch Lake
 The Bay
 Thompson Lake

Pierce County 
 Dead Slough Lake
 Gantenbein Lake
 George Lake (Spring Valley)
 Goose Lake
 Kinnickinnic Pond, Lower
 Kinnickinnic Pond, Upper
 Mud Lake (Upper)
 Nugget Lake
 River Falls Pond
 St. Croix Lake

Polk County 

 Andrus Lake (Little Round)
 Antler Lake (Pine)
 Apple River Flowage
 Aspen Lake
 Baker Lake
 Balsam Lake
 Barbo Lake
 Barneys Lake
 Bass Lake
 Bass Lake (Sterling)
 Bass Lake Springs
 Basswood Lake (Bass)
 Bear Lake
 Bear Trap Lake
 Beautiful Lake
 Beede Lake
 Big Blake Lake (Beautiful)
 Big Butternut Lake
 Big Lake
 Big Round Lake
 Black Lake
 Black Brook Flowage
 Black Brook Springs
 Blom Lake (Bloom)
 Bone Lake
 Bone Lake
 Briar Lake
 Bridget Lake (Mud)
 Brusher Lake
 Bullhead Lake
 Camelia Lake
 Camp Douglas Lake
 Cedar Lake
 Center Lake (Big)
 Church Pine Lake (Pine)
 Clam Falls Flowage
 Clara Lake
 Clarey Lake (Twin)
 Clauson Lake
 Clear Lake
 Clover Lake
 Coon Lake
 Crescent Lake (Pickerel)
 Crooked Lake
 Dace Lake (Mud)
 Dahl Lake
 Deer Lake
 Deer Lake
 Deer Lake
 Denny Lake
 Depot Lake
 Deronda Lake (Mud)
 Diamond Lake
 Dinger Lake
 East Lake
 East Lake
 East Lake
 Elbow Lake
 Elkins Lake
 Ellofson Lake
 Ember Lake
 Evergreen Lake (Deer)
 Fern Lake
 Fish Lake, South
 Footes Lake
 Forsythe Lake
 Fountain Lake
 Freedom Lakes
 French Lake
 Gabrielson Lake (Gabelson)
 Garfield Lake (Big Horseshoe)
 Gibson Lake
 Gilbert Lake
 Glovers Lake
 Godfrey Lake
 Grandquist Lake
 Grass Lake
 Greeley Lake
 Grenquist Lake (Greenquist)
 Grimhs Lake
 Grouse Lake
 Half Moon Lake
 Hamble Lakes (Twin)
 Hatchet Lake
 Hawthorn Lake
 Herby Lake (Lanesdale, Twin)
 Hickory Lake
 Highland Lake
 Hoover Lake
 Horse Lake
 Horseshoe Lake (Jensen)
 Horseshoe Lake
 Ice House Lake
 Ice Lake
 Indianhead Flowage
 Island Lake
 Island Lake
 Joel Flowage
 Johansen Lake (Johnson)
 Johnson Lake
 Kenabee Lake
 Kenny Lake
 King Lake (Pine)
 Knapp Flowage
 Knife Lake
 Lake Evelyn
 Lake o’the Dalles (Thaxter)
 Lake Round (Dwight)
 Lamont Lake
 Land Lake
 Largon Lake
 Larsen Lake
 Laurel Lake
 Lee Lake
 Lees Lake
 Legoo Lake
 Lincoln Lake
 Little Bass Lake
 Little Blake Lake
 Little Butternut Lake
 Little Horseshoe Lake
 Little Horseshoe Lake
 Little Largon Lake
 Little Mirror Lake (Pickerel)
 Little Pine Lake
 Little Round Lake
 Little Ward Lake
 Lone Pine Lake
 Long Lake
 Long Lake
 Long Lake
 Long Trade Lake
 Lost Lake
 Lost Lake
 Lotus Lake (East)
 Loveless Lake (Bass)
 Lykens Lake
 Mackie Lake
 Magnor Lake (Richardson)
 Manitou Lake
 Mansen Lake
 Margaret Lake
 Markee Spring
 Marlpit Spring
 Marsh Lake
 Martel Lake
 McKeith Lake
 McKenzie Lake
 Meadow Lake (Bog)
 Miller Camp Lake
 Moccasin Lake (Long)
 Mud Lake
 Mud Lake
 Mud Lake
 Mud Lake
 Mud Lake
 Mullins Lake
 Nimon Lake (Niemon)
 North Fish Lake (Fish)
 Orr Lake (Ore)
 Osceola Lake
 Otter Lake
 Palmer Lake
 Parker Lake
 Paulsen Lake (Alden)
 Paulson Lake
 Peaslee Lake
 Pike Lake
 Pine Island Lake
 Pine Lake (Larch)
 Pine Lake
 Pine Lake
 Pine Lake, Lower
 Pipe Lake
 Pipe Lake, North
 Pleasant Lake
 Pogo Lake (Big)
 Poplar Lake
 Rhinstad Lake
 Rice Lake
 Rice Lake (Cattail)
 Rice Lake (Glenton)
 Rice Lake
 Roger Lake
 Round Lake
 Round Lake
 Round Lake
 Round Lake
 Sand Lake
 Sandhill Lake (Sand)
 Sedge Lake
 Shiloh Lake
 Silver Lake
 Simpson Lake
 Skinaway Lake
 Snake Lake
 Snake Lake
 Snowshoe Lake
 Somers Lake
 Spur Lake (Little Pine)
 Square Lake
 Staples Lake
 Straight Lake
 Surprise Lake
 Swede Lake
 T Lake
 Tarbert Lake (Tabor, Twin)
 Toby Spring
 Trident Lake (Pine, King)
 Tula Lake
 Tuttle Lake
 Twenty-Ninth Lake
 Twin Lake
 Twin Lake, East
 Twin Lake, North
 Twin Lake, South
 Twin Lake, West
 Vincent Lake
 Wallin Lake
 Wapogasset Lake
 Ward Lake
 Weiss Lake
 White Ash Lake
 White Ash Lake, North
 Wild Goose Lake
 Wind Lake (Round)
 Wintergreen Lake
 Wolf Lake
 Woodsman Lake (Mud)
 Young Lake

Portage County 

 Adams Lake
 Amherst Millpond
 Anderson Lake
 Bakers Lake (Becker)
 Bass Lake (Claudes)
 Bear Lake
 Bentley Pond (Dana Pond)
 Bingo Lake
 Biron Flowage
 Boelter Lake (Marefield)
 Budesberg Lake (Severson)
 Clar-Re Lake
 Collins Lake (Fish)
 Deans Lake
 Dubay Lake
 East Lake (Wolf)
 Ebert Lake
 Ell Lake (L Lake)
 Emily Lake
 First Lake
 Fountain Lake
 Glisezinski Lake (Jaqueline)
 Goin Lake (Cow)
 Helen Lake
 Hintz Lake
 Jim Lake
 Johnson Lake
 Jordan Pond
 Julia Lake (Wards)
 Kranski Lake (Kraneks)
 Lime Lake
 Little Eau Pleine Flowage
 Lions Lake (Kilobassa)
 McDill Pond
 Meyers Lake
 Minister Lake (Preacher)
 Mud Lake
 Mud Lake
 Mud Lake
 Mud Lake
 Mud Lake
 Mudhole Lake
 Oesterle Lake (Osterle)
 Onland Lake (Round)
 Ostrowski Lake
 Pacawa Lake
 Pallen Lake
 Penny Lake (Mud)
 Peters Lake (Lutz)
 Pickerel Lake (Asbury)
 Pine Lake
 Pleasant Lake
 Plover River Flowage
 Reton Lake
 Riley Lake (Rough)
 Rinehart Lake
 Rosholt Millpond
 Second Lake
 Silver Lake
 Skunk Lake
 Slough Lake
 Spring Lake
 Springville Pond
 Stoltenburg Lake
 Sunset Lake
 Susan Lake
 Thomas Lake (Thamar)
 Thorn Lake
 Townline Reservoir
 Tree Lake (Three)
 Turtle Lake (Virgin)
 Twin Lake, North
 Twin Lake, South
 Van Order Pond (Christensen)
 Wazeecha Lake
 Windorf Lake
 Wisconsin River Flowage C1-Whiting
 Wisconsin River Flowage C2-Stevens Pt
 Wisconsin River Flowage C3-Stevens Pt
 Wolf Lake

Price County 

 Alice Lake
 Amik Lake (Rice, Pike)
 Anderson Lake
 Annie Lake
 Axels Lake
 Bass Lake
 Bass Lake
 Bass Lake
 Bass Lake
 Bass Lake
 Bear Lake
 Beaver Lake
 Beaverdam Lake
 Betsy Creek Springs
 Betsy Lake
 Big Brien Lake (Priens)
 Big Dardis Lake
 Big Pine Lake
 Blockhouse Lake
 Buckman Lake
 Bullhead Lake
 Burd Lake
 Butternut Lake
 CampSprings
 Camp Four Springs
 Camp Nine Springs
 Carp Lake
 Cat Lake (Pot)
 Cochram Lake
 Constellation Lake
 Cooley Lake
 Coolidge Lake
 Cranberry Lake
 Cranberry Lake
 Crane
 Crowley Flowage
 Dankes Lake
 Dave Lake
 Davis Lake
 Deadman Slough
 Deer Lake
 Deer Lake
 Dog Lake
 Donavan Lake
 Duroy Lake
 Elk Lake
 Ferry Springs
 Fickle Lake
 Foulds Creek Flowage
 Foulds Springs
 Gardner Lake
 Gates Lake
 Granger Lake
 Grassy Lake
 Hansen Lake
 Hay Creek Pond
 Hay Lake
 Hogback Springs (Spur)
 Homestead Lake
 Hultman Lake
 Iodine Lake
 Island Lake
 Jackson Springs
 Janacek Springs
 Johnson Lake
 Jupa Lake
 Kabol Lake
 Lac Sault Dore (Soo)
 Le Claire Lake (Mud)
 Le Tourneau Lake
 Leonards Lake, East
 Leonards Lake, West
 Lindberg Lake
 Little Bass Lake
 Little Brien Lake
 Little Dardis Lake
 Long Lake
 Long Lake
 Lost Lake
 Lost Lake
 McArthur Lake
 McIlquham Lake
 Meadow Lake
 Miles Lake
 Mill Pond
 Mink Spring
 Minnow Lake
 Mud Lake
 Mud Lake
 Mud Lake
 Mud Lake
 Mud Lake
 Murphy Lake
 Musser Flowage
 Nettie B Lake
 Newman Lake
 Newman Springs
 Nichols Lake (Little Joe)
 Niebauer Springs
 Ogema Millpond
 Oles Lake
 Ottertail Springs
 Ouimetta Lake
 Oxbo Lake
 Park Falls Flowage, Lower
 Park Falls Flowage, Upper
 Patterson Lake
 Pearson Lake
 Penny Lake
 Perch Lake
 Perch Lake
 Peters Lake
 Pike Lake
 Pixley Flowage (Smith Lake)
 Planet Lake (Fourmile)
 Pond Lake
 Pot Lake (Cat)
 Prentice Flowage
 Price Lake, Lower
 Price Lake, Middle
 Price Lake, Upper
 Priest Lake
 Riley Lake
 Risberg Lake
 Round Lake
 Round Lake
 S Lake (South)
 Sailor Creek Flowage
 Sailor Lake
 Schnur Lake
 Seven Lake
 Sixteen Lake
 Solberg Lake
 Spirit Lake
 Spirit Lake, North
 Spring Creek Flowage
 Spur Lake
 Aabajijiwang Flowage
 Steve Creek Flowage, Lower
 Stone Lake
 Sweeney Lake (Swedey)
 Tackle Lake
 Ten Lake
 Thirty-Five Lake, Lower
 Thirty-Five Lake, Middle
 Thirty-Five Lake, Upper
 Thompson Lake
 Three Lake
 Timms Lake
 Townline Lake
 Township Corners Flowage
 Tracy Lake
 Tucker Lake
 Turner Lake
 Twin Lakes
 Warner Lake
 Whitcomb Lake
 Willow Springs
 Wilson Lake
 Wilson Lake (Wilson Creek Flowage)
 Wintergreen Lake
 Worcester Lake

Racine County 

 Bisanabi Lake (Johnson)
 Bohner Lake
 Brock Lake
 Browns Lake
 Buena Lake
 Delmonte Lake
 Denoon Lake
 Eagle Lake
 Echo Lake
 Kec-Nong-Ga-Mong Lake (Long)
 Lake Tahoe
 Leda Lake (Frieda)
 Long Lake
 Overson Pond
 Racine Quarry
 Rockland Lake
 Rodgers Pond
 Tichigan Lake
 Waubeesee Lake (Minister)
 Wind Lake

Richland County 
 Balmoral Pond
 Coffinberry Slough
 Cruson Slough
 Garner Lake
 Lee Lake (Cazenovia Millpond)
 Long Lake
 Lower Lake
 Richland Center Millpond
 Smith Lake

Rock County 

 Afton Gravel Pits
 Bowers Lake
 Clear Lake
 Duck Lake
 Gibbs Lake (Big Spring)
 Grass Lake
 Grass Lake
 Kiwanis Pond (Janesville Gravel Pit, Atlas)
 Koshkonong Lake
 Leota Lake
 Lions Park Pond (Trout Pond)
 Little Gibbs Lake (Lower)
 Mud Lake (Forest)
 Muskrat Lake
 Sheepskin Lake
 Spauldings Pond
 Stebbinsville Pond
 Storrs Lake
 Willies Pond

Rusk County 

 Amacoy Lake
 Atwood Lake
 Audie Lake
 Bass Lake
 Bass Lake
 Bass Lake
 Bass Lake
 Bear Lake
 Beauty Lake
 Big Bowker Lake (Parker)
 Big Falls Flowage
 Bog Lake
 Bollman Lake
 Boot Lake
 Bruce Lake
 Bruno Lake
 Brush Lake
 Bucks Lake
 Bull Moose Lake
 Cadotte Lake
 Caley Lake
 Chain Lake
 Clear Lake
 Coon Lake
 Corbett Lake
 Cranberry Lake
 Cummings Lake, North
 Cummings Lake, South
 Dairyland Reservoir
 Four Lake
 Dead Goose Lake
 Dickey Lake
 Dump Lake
 Fireside Lakes (Rice, Mud)
 Fish Lake
 Galky Lake
 Goose Lake
 Hawkins Millpond
 Hill Trail Flowage
 Hogskin Lake
 Holcombe Flowage
 Horseshoe Lake
 Hungry Lake
 Island Lake
 Koehler Lake
 Ladysmith Flowage
 Lake Four
 Lake La Verne
 Lake One
 Lake Three
 Lake Two
 Lea Flowage (Lea Lake)
 Little Bear Lake
 Little Bowker Lake (Perdziak)
 Long Lake
 Lost Lake
 Lost Mans Lake
 MacDonald Lake
 Marsh Lake
 Mathy Lake
 MeGee Lake
 McCann Lake
 Murphy Flowage
 Muskrat Lake
 North Lake
 Park Lake
 Perch Lake (Bass)
 Pickerel Lake C1
 Pickerel Lake C2
 Pickerel Lake C3
 Port Arthur Flowage
 Pine Lake
 Pine Lake
 Potato Lake
 Pulaski Lake
 Rock Lake
 Round Lake
 Rusk Lake
 Sand Lake
 Saxton Lake
 School Lake
 Shamrock Lake
 Skinner Creek Flowage
 Star Lake
 Star Lake
 Styles Lake
 Sugar Lake
 Sunfish Lake
 Thornapple Flowage
 Three Lakes No.1
 Three Lakes No.2
 Three Lakes No.3
 Twin Lake, East
 Two Bear Lake
 Washington Creek Flowage
 Whiplash Lake

St. Croix County 

 Anderson Springs
 Apple Falls Flowage
 Bass Lake
 Bierbrauer (WPA) R
 Brushy Mound Lake
 Bushnell Lake
 Bushy Lake
 Casey Lake
 Cedar Lake
 Dry Dam Lake
 George Lake (Spring Valley)
 Glen Lake
 Goose Pond
 Harmin Lake
 Hatfield Lake
 Levesque Spring
 Little Bushy Lake
 Little Falls Lake
 Mallalieu Lake
 New Richmond Flowage
 North Bass
 Oakridge Lake
 Perch Lake
 Pine Lake (Baldwin)
 Pine Lake (Somerset)
 Riverdale Flowage
 St. Croix Lake
 Apple Lake
 Strand Lake
 Three Lakes
 Turtle Lake
 Twin Lake, West
 Twin Lake, East

Sauk County 

 Bakkens Pond
 Blass Lake
 Buckhorn Lake
 Cynthia Slough
 Deacon Thomas Lake
 Delton Lake
 Devil's Lake
 Dutch Hollow Lake
 Hemlock Slough
 Hill Slough
 Hutter Slough
 Jones Slough
 Kilbourn Flowage
 La Valle Pond
 Lake of the Dells
 LeLand Millpond
 Long Lake
 Mirror Lake
 Norton Slough
 Redstone Lake
 Seeley Lake
 Virginia Lake
 White Mound Lake
 Wisconsin Lake
 Wood Slough

Sawyer County 

 Adina Lake
 Ashegon Lake (Bass)
 Balsam Lake
 Barber Lake
 Barker Lake
 Bean Brook Springs
 Beaver Creek Spring
 Beaver Lake
 Beaver Lake
 Bennett Lake
 Benson Springs
 Bentley Lake (Little Buck)
 Beverly Lake
 Billy Boy Flowage
 Birch Lake
 Black Dan Lake (McDonald)
 Black Lake (Birch)
 Blaisdell Lake
 Blue Gill Lake (Bass)
 Blueberry Lake
 Boos Lake
 Boribo Lake
 Borns Lake
 Buckhorn Spring
 Buff Lake
 Bulldog Springs
 Bullhead Lake
 Bullhead Lake
 Bunker Lake
 Burd Lake
 Burns Lake
 Byrd Lake
 Callahan Lake
 Camp Four Lake (Narrow)
 Camp Four Lake, East
 Camp Four Lake, West
 Camp Smith Lake
 Carpenter Lake
 Catfish Lake
 Cattail Lake
 Champagne Lake
 Chetac Lake
 Chip Lake
 Christner Lake
 Christy Lake
 Clam Lake, Lower
 Clear Lake
 Colbroth Lake
 Connors Lake
 Connors Spring
 County Line Lake (Line)
 Currier Lake
 Davies Lake (Bog)
 Davis Lake
 Dead Creek Spring (Dead Lake)
 Dead Lake
 Deer Lake
 Delano Lake (Altony)
 Devils Lake
 Durphee Lake
 Eagle Nest Lake
 Eddy Creek Spring
 Evelyn Lake (Perry)
 Evergreen Lake
 Farnsworth Lake
 Fawn Lake
 Fawn Lake
 Grim Flowage
 Filing Shed Lake
 Fishtrap Lake
 Foo Lake
 Fortyone Creek Spring
 Garbutt Lake
 Ghost Creek Spring
 Ghost Lake
 Glover Lake
 Goodman Lake
 Goodwin Lake
 Goose Lake
 Grant Lake
 Graveyard Spring
 Green Lake
 Green Lake
 Grindstone Lake
 Grindstone Spring
 Grindstone Spring, Lower
 Grindstone Spring, Upper
 Gurno Lake
 Hadley Lake
 Ham Lake
 Hanson Lake
 Hauer Spring
 Hauer Spring, Lower
 Hay Creek Springs
 Hayward Lake
 Hegmeister Lake (Deer)
 Helane Lake
 Heron Lake
 Hess Lake
 Holly Lake, Lower (Holly)
 Holly Lake, Upper (Holly)
 Holmes Lake
 Hope Lake
 Horseshoe Lake
 Horseshoe Lake
 Hub Lake
 Hungry Lake (Runzel)
 Hunter Lake
 Ike Lake
 Indian Lake (Bass)
 Indian School Lake
 Island Lake
 Island Lake
 Jacques Lake
 James Lake
 Johnson Lake
 Johnson Lake
 Kelly Lake (WPA Cranberry)
 Knuteson Lake (Knudson)
 Knuteson Spring
 Lac Courte Oreilles
 Lake Chippewa (Chippewa Flowage)
 Lake of the Pines (Pickerel)
 Lewis Lake
 Little Cranberry Lake (Lake Bass)
 Little Lac Courte Oreilles
 Little Ole Lake
 Little Round Lake
 Little Round Lake
 Little Sand Lake
 Little Sissabagama Lake
 Little Spring Lake
 Loretta Lake (U Brunet Flowage)
 Lost Lake
 Lost Lake
 Lost Land Lake
 Lovejoy Lake (Fish)
 Lynch Lake
 Maple Spring
 Mason Lake
 McClaine Lake
 McClaine Lake (Birch)
 McDermott Lake
 McLaren Lake (McLarens)
 Meadow Lake
 Merry Lake
 Miller Lake
 Milny Lake
 Minnemac Lake
 Mirror Lake
 Moose Lake
 Mosquito Brook Spring
 Moss Creek Springs
 Mossback Lake
 Mud Lake
 Mud Lake
 Mud Lake
 Mud Lake
 Mud Lake
 Mud Lake
 Mukwonago Lake
 Murphy Lake
 Nelson Lake (Totagatic Flowage)
 Noble Lake (Big Bass)
 North Lake
 Ole Lake
 One Shoe Lake
 Osgood Lake
 Pacwawong Lake
 Pacwawong Spring
 Partridge Crop Lake
 Patsy Lake
 Pearce Lake
 Pelican Lake (Little Pelican)
 Perch Lake
 Perch Lake
 Petty Lake
 Phipps Flowage
 Phipps Lake
 Phipps Spring
 Pickerel Lake
 Pike Lake
 Pine Island Lake
 Placid Lake (Bass)
 Porcupine Lake
 Price Creek Spring
 Radisson Flowage
 Red Cedar Springs
 Red Ike Lake
 Reed Lake
 Ring Lake
 Rogers Lake
 Round Lake (Big Round)
 Rush Lake
 Sabin Lake
 Saddle Lake
 Sand Lake
 Schoolhouse Lake (School)
 Sickles Lake
 Silverthorn Lake
 Sissabagama Lake
 Skinner Creek Flowage
 Smith Lake
 Snag Lake
 Snipe Lake
 South Lake, North
 South Lake, South
 Spider Lake
 Spot Lake
 Spring Lake
 Spring Lake
 Spruce Lake
 Osprey Lake
 Star Lake
 Stearns Lake
 Summit Lake
 Sunfish Lake
 Swamp Lake
 Tamarack Lake
 Teal Lake
 Teal River Flowage
 Thomas Lake
 Thornapple Spring
 Tiger Cat Flowage (Lower Twin)
 Tiger Cat Flowage (Twin)
 Tiger Cat Flowage (Upper Twin)
 Totagatic Flowage
 Tripp Lake
 Trout Lake
 Turk Spring
 Turtle Lake
 Twenty-Seven Lake (Bass)
 Two Axe Lake
 Two Boys Lake
 Two Deer Lake
 Venison Lake
 Venison Spring
 Villard Lake
 Weirgor Lake (Bass)
 Weirgor Springs
 Whiplash Lake (Whipfast)
 White Birch Lake (Birch)
 Whitefish Lake
 Williams Lake (Island)
 Wilson Lake
 Windfall Lake
 Windigo Lake (Bass)
 Winter Lake (Price Flowage)
 Wise Lake

Shawano County 

 Bahr Lake
 Baker Lake
 Beaulieu Lake
 Big Lake
 Bowler Pond
 Caroline Pond
 Cranberry Lake
 Deer Spring Lake
 Dollar Lake
 Grass Lake
 Gray Lake (Grey)
 Hennig Lake (Henning)
 Homme Pond
 Island Lake (Little)
 Kersten Lake
 Kolpack Lake
 Koonz Lake
 Korth Lake
 Kroening Lake
 Leopolis Pond
 Lily Lake
 Long Lake
 Loon Lake
 Lost Lake
 Lulu Lake
 Malone Lake
 Marion Pond
 Mildred Lake
 Mission Lake
 Mondl Spring
 Moon Lake
 Mud Lake
 Pautz Lake
 Pella Pond
 Pensaukee Lakes
 Pine Lake
 Pleasant Lake (Aniwa)
 Red Lake, Lower (Weed Dam Pond)
 Red Lake, Upper (Gresham Pond)
 Round Lake
 Schoenick Lake (Schoenrock)
 Shawano Lake
 Smith Lake
 Sportsman Lake
 Spring Lake
 Tigerton Pond
 Tilleda Pond
 Wagner Lake (Waggoner)
 Washington Lake (Mud)
 White Clay Lake
 White Lake
 Wilson Lake
 Wolf River Pond

Sheboygan County 

 Batavis Pond
 Beechwood Lake
 Bullet Lake
 Butler Lake
 Cascade Millpond
 Cedar Lake
 Crooked Lake
 Crystal Lake
 Dollar Lake
 Elkhart Lake (Big Elkhart)
 Ellen Lake
 Gerber Lake (Big Gerber)
 Glenbeulah Millpond
 Glenbeulah Springs
 Goosevelle Millpond
 Grasser Lake (Dacada)
 Haack Lake
 Hingham Mill Pond
 Jetzers Lake
 Johnsonville Pond
 Kelling Lakes
 Kelling Lakes
 Kellings Lake
 Kohler Mill Pond
 Little Elkhart Lake
 Little Gerber Lake
 Little Round Lake
 Long Lake
 Otter Pond
 Plymouth Mill Pond
 Random Lake
 Seven Lake
 Sheboygan Falls Pond
 Sheboygan Falls Quarry
 Sheboygan Lake
 Sheboygan Quarry
 Sixteen Lake
 Spring Lake (Random)
 Waldo Mill Pond

Taylor County 

 Anderson Lake
 Anderson Lake
 Birch Lake (Lake No. 2)
 Black Lake
 Blank Lake (Blacken)
 Bullhead Lake
 Bullhead Lake
 Bullhead Lake
 Bullhead Lake
 Camp 8 Flowage
 Chelsea Lake
 Chequamegon Waters Flowage
 Chub Lake
 Clarke Lake
 Clear Lake
 Cronin Lake
 Diamond Lake
 Duchien Lake
 East Lake
 Eleven Lake
 Ellis Flowage
 Esadore Lake
 Eska Lake
 Flowage C1-Pershing
 Flowage C2-Pershing
 Flowage C3-Pershing
 Foss Lake
 Gibbs Lake
 Grassy Knoll Lake
 Half Moon Lake
 Harper Lake, North
 Harper Lake, South
 Heron Lake
 Holzer Flowage
 Horseshoe Lake
 Horton Lake
 Hulls Lake
 James Lake
 Jerry Lake
 Kathryn Lake
 Kennedy Lake (Muddy Rib)
 Ketcham Lake
 Kettle Lake
 Keyes Lake
 Kleutch Lake
 Laher Lake (Lagher)
 Leuthey Lake
 Little Chelsea Lake
 Little Rib Lake
 Long Lake
 Long Lake
 Long Lake
 Lost Lake
 Macnamar Lake
 Marion Lake
 Matt Ochs Lake
 Medford Flowage
 Mondeaux Flowage
 Monson Flowage
 Mud Lake
 Mud Lake
 Mud Lake
 Mud Lake
 Mud Lake
 Mud Lake
 Nancy Lake
 Niene Lake
 Nineteen Lake
 Nona Lake
 Pechstein Lake
 Perch Lake
 Pickerel Lake
 Polack Lake
 Reich Lake No. 1
 Reich Lake No. 2
 Rib Lake
 Richter Lake
 Sackett Lake
 Saint Clair Lake
 Salem Lake
 Schoolhouse Lake
 Scoof Lake
 Shearer Lake
 Skinner Lake
 Sotak Flowage
 Spirit Lake
 Spirit Lake, North
 Spruce Lake
 Sue Lake
 Thief Lake
 Thirty Lake
 Thirty-Three Lake
 Twin Lake, North
 Twin Lake, South
 Upper Steve Creek Flowage
 Washington Flowage
 Waterfowl Flowage (Redman)
 Wellington Lake
 Witt Flowage
 Wood Lake

Trempealeau County 
 Bugle Lake
 Dodge Lake
 Eleva Pond
 First Lake
 Golf Course Pond
 Henry Lake
 Marinuka Lake
 Martha Lake
 Osseo Club Pond
 Pigeon Falls Pond
 Round Lake
 Second Lake
 Strum Lake (Crystal)
 Third Lake

Vernon County 
 Desoto Bay
 Esofea Pond
 Field Veterans Memorial Lake
 Jersey Valley Lake
 Muskrat Lake
 Runge Hollow Lake
 Seas Branch Pond
 Sidie Hollow Lake
 Waller Lake, North and South  Battle Sough

Vilas County

Walworth County 

 Army Lake (East Troy)
 Beulah Lake
 Booth Lake
 Cedar Grove Pond
 Como Lake
 Comus Lake
 Cravath Lake
 Delavan Lake
 East Troy Pond (Trent)
 Geneva Lake
 Green Lake (Lauderdale Lakes)
 Hilburn Pond
 Honey Lake (Vienna)
 Ivanhoe Lake (Ryan)
 La Grange Lake
 Lake Benedict
 Lorraine Lake
 Lulu Lake
 Middle Lake (Lauderdale Lakes)
 Mill Lake (Lauderdale Lakes)
 North Lake (Holden)
 Number Ten Lake
 Pell Lake
 Peters Lake
 Pickerel Lake
 Pleasant Lake
 Potter Lake
 Powers Lake
 Rice Lake (Lower Whitewater)
 Silver Lake
 Swan Lake (Mud)
 Swift Lake
 Tombeau Lake
 Tripp Lake (Trapp)
 Turtle Lake
 Wandawega Lake (Otter)
 Whitewater Lake (Bass, Kettle)

Washburn County 

 Adventure Lake
 Alder Lake
 Anah Springs
 Baker Lake
 Balsam Lake
 Banks Lake
 Bashaw Trout Springs
 Bass Lake
 Bass Lake
 Bass Lake
 Bean Brook Spring
 Bean Lake
 Bear Lake
 Beartrack Lake
 Beartrap Lake
 Beaver Lake
 Beaver Lodge Pond (Cassidy)
 Berry Lake (Noble)
 Big Bass Lake
 Big Casey Lake
 Big Devil Lake (Audubon)
 Big McKenzie Lake
 Birch Lake
 Bodins Lake
 Bond Lake
 Boyle Brook Spring
 Bridge Lake
 Brinkman Lake
 Browns Lake
 Bughouse Lake
 Cable Lake
 Camp Lake
 Casey Creek Flowage
 Casper Lake
 Chain Lake
 Chain Lake
 Chicog Lake
 Chinty Lake
 Chippanazie Lake
 Cloverleaf Lake
 Colton Flowage
 County Line Lake (Line)
 Cranberry Flowage
 Cranberry Lake
 Crystal Lake
 Cyclone Lake
 Dago Creek Springs
 Deep Lake
 Deep Lake
 Deep Lake
 Deer Lake
 Deer Lake
 Derosier Lake
 Devils Lake
 Dilly Lake (Dilley)
 Dock Lake		
 Dugan Lake
 Dunn Lake
 Earl Springs
 Elbow Lake
 Eliza Lake
 Elizabeth Lake
 Ellsworth Lake
 Evergreen Lake
 Fawn Lake
 Fenton Lake
 Fish Lake
 Floyd Lake
 Gardner Lake
 Gilmore Lake
 Glendennon Lake
 Goose Lake
 Goose Lake
 Grass Lake
 Grassy Lake
 Green Lake
 Gull Creek Springs
 Gull Lake
 Harmon Lake
 Harrison Lake
 Haugen Lake
 Hay Lake
 Heart Lake
 Hointville Lake
 Holmes Lake
 Horseshoe Lake
 Horseshoe Lake
 Horseshoe Spring
 Island Lake
 Jerry Lake
 Johnson Lake
 Kekegama Lake
 Kimball Lake, Lower
 Kimball Lake, Middle
 Kimball Lake, Upper
 King Lake
 Kingelm Lake
 Kinny Lake (Kinney)
 Lakeside Lake
 Lazy Island Lake
 Leach Lake
 Leaman Lake
 Leesome Lake (Bass)
 Leisure Lake (Skunk)
 Leonard Lake
 Lincoln Lake
 Little Bass Lake
 Little Bass Lake
 Little Cable Lake
 Little Casey Lake
 Little Devil Lake (Devils)
 Little Dugan Lake
 Little Grassy Lake
 Little Kekegama Lake
 Little Long Lake
 Little Mackay Creek Spring
 Little Mud Lake
 Little Ripley Lake
 Little Sand Lake
 Little Spooner Lake
 Little Stone Lake
 Long Lake
 Loon Lake
 Loon Lake
 Loon Lake
 Loon Lake
 Loon Lake (Spook)
 Lost Lake
 Lost Lake
 Lost Lake
 Loyhead Lake
 Lucky Lake
 Lutz Lake
 Mack Lake
 Mackay Springs
 Macrae Lake
 Mallard Lake
 Matson Lake
 Matthews Lake
 McCune Lake
 McDermott Lake
 McKenzie Lake, Lower
 McKenzie Lake, Middle
 McKenzie Springs
 McKinley Lake
 McLain Lake
 Middle Lake (Middle Twin)
 Miles Lake
 Mill Pond
 Miller Lake
 Minong Flowage (Lake Nancy)
 Monday Lake
 Moody Lake
 Mosinee Springs
 Mosquito Lake
 Mud Lake
 Mud Lake
 Mud Lake
 Mud Lake
 Nancy Lake
 Nice Lake
 Nick Lake
 No Mans Lake
 Oak Lake
 Oak Lake
 Offers Lake
 Ole Lake
 Otter Lake
 Pavlas Lake
 Pear Lake
 Perch Lake
 Peters Lake
 Peufald Lake
 Peufald Lake
 Peufald Lake
 Pickerel Lake
 Pine Island Lake
 Pine Lake
 Pokegama Lake
 Pollywog Lake
 Potato Lake
 Rainy Lake
 Randall Lake
 Rappy Lake
 Red Lake
 Red Cedar Lake
 Reflection Lake
 Rice Lake
 Rigler Lake
 Ripley Lake (Big Ripley)
 Ripley Lake
 River Lake
 Rock Lake
 Rocky Ridge Lake
 Round Lake
 Round Lake
 Round Lake
 Sams Lake
 Sand Lake
 Sawmill Lake
 Sawyer Creek Springs
 Schullenberger Lake
 Scoot Lake
 Scovils Lake
 Severson Lake
 Seymour Lake
 Shallow Lake
 Shallow Lake
 Shell Lake
 Sherman Lake
 Shingle Camp Lake
 Silver Lake
 Sleepy Eye Lake
 Slim Creek Flowage
 Slim Lake
 Snag Lake
 Spider Lake No. 1
 Spider Lake No. 2
 Spider Lake No. 3
 Spider Lake No. 4
 Spider Lake No. 5
 Spooner Lake
 Sport Lake
 Spring Creek Springs
 Spring Lake
 Spring Lake
 Spring Lake
 Spring Lake
 Spring Lake
 Spute Lake
 Stanberry Lake
 Star Lake
 Starkey Lake
 Stauffer Lake
 Stone Lake
 Stone Lake
 Sugar Bush Lake
 Sugarbush Lake
 Sunfish Lake (Daisy)
 Superior Lake
 Taylor Lake (Cranberry)
 Telstar Lake (Block)
 Tomahawk Lake
 Tony Lake
 Totagatic Flowage
 Tower Lake
 Tozer Lake
 Tozer Springs
 Tranus Lake
 Trego Lake
 Trego Pond
 Tucker Lake
 Twin Lake, East
 Twin Lake, North (Twin Lakes)
 Twin Lake, South (Twin Lakes)
 Twin Lake, West
 Veazie Springs
 Vollmers Lake
 Warner Lake
 Watson Lake
 Welsh Lake
 West Lake
 Westenberg Spring
 Whalen Lake
 Whalen Springs
 Wilcox Lake
 Wilcox Lake, East
 Wilcox Lake, West
 Wilkerson Lake
 Wolf Lake
 Yechout Lake
 Yellow River Flowage

Washington County 

 Allis Lake (Leinberger)
 Amy Bell Lake (Amy Dell)
 Bark Lake
 Barton Pond
 Beck Lake
 Big Cedar Lake
 Boltonville Millpond
 Brickyard Lake
 Druid Lake
 Ehne Lake
 Erler Lake
 Five, Lake
 Friess Lake (Fries)
 Gilbert Lake
 Green Lake
 Hartford Millpond
 Hasmer Lake
 Hawthorn Lake
 Hickey Lake
 Keowns Pond
 Kewaskum Millpond
 Kohlsville Millpond
 Lehner Lake
 Lenwood Lake (Benike)
 Little Cedar Lake
 Little Drickens Lake
 Little Friess Lake (Bony)
 Lohr Pond
 Lowes Lake (Lowe)
 Lucas Lake
 Malloy Lake
 McConville Lake
 Miller Lake
 Mud Lake
 Mud Lake
 Mueller Lake (Millers)
 Murphy Lake
 Newburg Pond
 Paradise Valley (Hackbarth)
 Pike Lake
 Proschinger Lake
 Quas Lake
 Radtke Lake
 Rockfield Quarry Pond
 Silver Lake (Paradise Valley)
 Smith Lake (Dickens)
 Tilly Lake (Jackson)
 Twelve, Lake
 Wallace Lake
 Werner Pond

Waukesha County 

 Applebecker Millpond
 Ashippun Lake
 Bass Bay Lake
 Beaver Dam Lake
 Beaver Lake
 Big Bend Pond
 Big Muskego Lake
 Bowron Lake (Widgeon)
 Brown Lake
 Buth Lake
 Cornell Lake
 Cornell Lake (Mud)
 Crooked Lake
 Crystal Lake
 Denoon Lake
 Duck Lake
 Dutchman Lake (Ladl)
 Eagle Spring Lake (Eagle Lake)
 Egg Lake
 Etter Lake
 Five Lake
 Florence Lake
 Forest Lake
 Fowler Lake
 Garvin Lake
 Genesee Lake, Lower
 Genesee Lake, Middle
 Genesee Lake, Upper (Otis)
 Golden Lake
 Henrietta Lake
 Hogan Lake
 Hunters Lake
 Keesus, Lake
 Kelly Lake, Lower
 Kelly Lake, Upper
 Lac La Belle
 Lannon County Park Pond
 Larkin Lake
 Laura Lake (Leota)
 Linnie Lac Lake
 Little Muskego Lake
 Merton Millpond
 Monches Millpond
 Monterey Millpond
 Moose Lake
 Mukwonago Park Pond
 Nagawicka Lake
 Nashotah Lake, Lower
 Nashotah Lake, Upper
 Nemahbin Lake, Lower
 Nemahbin Lake, Upper
 New Berlin Quarry Pond
 Norris Pond
 North Lake
 Oconomowoc Lake
 Oconomowoc Lake, Upper
 Okauchee Lake
 Ottawa Lake (Silver, Lean)
 Pewaukee Lake
 Phantom Lake, Lower (Howitt)
 Phantom Lake, Upper
 Pine Lake
 Pretty Lake
 Rainbow Springs Lake
 Reagon Lake
 Roxy Pond (Mukwonago Park)
 Saratoga Lake
 Saylesville Millpond
 School Section Lake
 Scuppernong Creek Pond
 Silver Lake
 Spahn Lake
 Spring Lake
 Spring Lake (Dousman)
 Sybil Lake
 Tamarack Lake
 Tierney Lake
 Utica Lake
 Waterville Lake
 Willow Spring
 Wood Lake

Waupaca County 

 Bailey Lake
 Bass Lake
 Bass Lake (Chain)
 Bear Lake
 Beasley Lake (Chain)
 Big Falls Pond
 Big Lake
 Black Lake (Knutson)
 Blue Mountain Lake (Goerke)
 Brekke Lake (Bestul)
 Buck Lake
 Campbell Lake
 Cary Pond
 Casey Lake (Foster)
 Cedar Lake
 Chapin Lake
 Cincoe Lake
 Colic Bayou (Pickerel)
 Columbia Lake (Chain)
 Crystal Lake
 Dake Lake (Chain)
 Driscol Lake
 Emmons Lake, North
 Emmons Lake, South
 Flynn Lake
 Foster Lake
 Fox Lake
 Fremont Pond
 George Lake (Chain)
 Godhal Lake (Goodhal, Moon)
 Gooseneck Lake
 Graham Lake (Nelson)
 Grass Lake
 Gregerson Lake (Gregorson)
 Grenlie Lake
 Gurholt Lake
 Hartman Lake (Allen)
 Hatch Lake
 Herman Lake
 Holman Lake
 Horseshoe Bayou
 Iola Lake (Iola Millpond)
 Jacklin Lake
 Jackson Lake
 Jenny Bayou
 Jenson Lake
 Johnson Lake
 Jones Lake
 Junction Lake (June)
 Kating Lake (Kyton)
 Keller Lake
 Kinney Lake
 Knight Lake (Chain)
 Knutson Lake (Black)
 Limekiln Lake (Chain)
 Little Hope Millpond
 Little Horseshoe Bayou
 Little Lake
 Little Long Lake (Lembke)
 Long Lake (Chain)
 Long Lake
 Long Lake
 Lutz Lake (Kruse)
 Manawa Millpond
 Manomin Lake (Chain)
 Marion Millpond
 Marl Lake (Chain)
 Marl Lake
 McAllister Lake
 McCrossen Lake (Chain)
 McLean Lake
 Meed Lake
 Michael Lake
 Mill Cut (Pea Soup Bayou)
 Miller Bayou
 Miner Lake (Chain)
 Mirror Lake
 Mountain Lake
 Mud Lake
 Mud Lake
 Mud Lake
 Mud Lake
 Mud Lake
 Mud Lake
 Myklebust Lake
 Mynyard Lake
 Nessling Lake (Chain)
 Newsome Lake
 Norby Lake
 North Lake
 Northland Flowage
 Ogdensburg Pond
 Old Taylor Lake (Taylor)
 Orlando Lake (Chain)
 Otter Lake (Chain)
 Ottman Lake (Chain)
 Partridge Crop Lake
 Partridge Lake
 Peterson Creek MillPond
 Pfeiffer Lake
 Pigeon Lake
 Pope Lake (Chain)
 Preuss Lake
 Price Lake
 Rainbow Lake (Chain)
 Rasmussens Lake
 Rich Lake (Mud)
 Roland Lake (Bestul)
 Rollofson Lake
 Round Lake
 Round Lake (Chain)
 Round Lake
 Sand Bar Lake, East
 Sand Bar Lake, West
 Sand Lake (Jensen)
 Scandinavia Millpond
 School Section Lake
 Shadow Lake
 Shambeau Lake (Woodnorth)
 Shaw Landing
 Siemer Lake (Selmer)
 Silver Lake (Anderson)
 Silver Lake
 Skunk Lake
 Solitude Lake
 Spencer Lake (Silver)
 Spring Lake
 Storm Lake (Sturm)
 Stratton Lake
 Sunset Lake (Chain)
 Taylor Lake (Chain)
 Templeton Bayou
 Tom Bayou
 Traders Bayou
 Twin Lake, North (Big Twin)
 Twin Lake, South (Little Twin)
 Vesey Lake
 Waupaca MillPond
 Weyauwega Lake
 White Lake
 Woodnorth Lake
 Youngs Lake (Chain)

Waushara County 

 Alpine Lake
 Auroraville Millpond
 Baitenger Lake
 Bannerman Lake
 Bass Lake
 Beans Lake (Hensen)
 Big Cedar Lake
 Big Hills Lake (Hills)
 Big Twin Lake (Twin)
 Bing Lake (Calugi, Round)
 Bohn Lake
 Brownlow Lake (Mud)
 Bughs Lake
 Chain Lake
 Clarks Millpond
 Cooks Lake
 Curtis Lake
 Deer Lake
 Echo Lake
 Emerald Lake
 Fenrich Springs
 Fish Lake
 Fish Lake
 Flynns Quarry
 Gilbert Lake
 Horsehead Lake (Eastlings)
 Huron Lake
 Idlewild Millpond
 Irogami Lake (Fish)
 Jeanette Lake (Portage)
 Johns Lake
 Jordans Lake
 Kawalski Lake
 Kristine Lake
 Kusel Lake (Koosel)
 Little Beans Lake
 Little Cedar Lake
 Little Hills Lake
 Little Lake
 Little Twin Lake
 Lohrville Quarry
 Long Lake
 Long Lake
 Lost Lake
 Lucerne Lake (Egans)
 Lucky Lake (Fratzke)
 Lyman Lake (Hartford)
 Marl Lake
 Mecan Springs
 Meilke Lake (Pickerel)
 Middle Lake
 Morris Lake (Mt Morris)
 Mud Lake
 Mud Lake
 Mud Lake
 Napowan Lake (Funk)
 Norwegian Lake
 Pearl Lake
 Pickerel Lake
 Pine Lake (Hancock)
 Pine Lake (Springwater)
 Pine River Millpond
 Plainfield Lake
 Pleasant Lake
 Pochman Lake
 Porters Lake
 Poy Sippi Millpond
 Poygan Lake
 Pretty Lake
 Redgranite Quarry
 Rogers Pond
 Round Lake
 Round Lake
 Sand Lake
 Saxeville Millpond
 School Pond
 Shumway Lake (Smith)
 Silver Lake
 Silver Lake
 Spring Lake
 Shikaakwa Lake
 Taylor Lake
 Timan Lake
 Tippetts Lake (Tibbetts)
 Turtle Lake
 Ueeck Lake
 Virginia Lake (Pomplums)
 Wautoma Lake
 Wautoma Pond
 West Branch Mill Pond (White River)
 West Point Quarry
 Weymouth Lake
 White River Flowage (Lower Pond)
 Wild Rose Millpond
 Wilcox Lake
 Wilson Lake
 Witters Lake
 Zinke Lake

Winnebago County 
 Butte des Morts Lake
 Hogers Bayou (Martin)
 Little Lake Butte des Morts
 Lous Quarry
 Poygan Lake
 Rush Lake
 Lake Winnebago
 Lake Winneconne

Wood County 
 Biron Flowage
 Centralia Flowage
 Dexter Lake
 Lake Kaunewinne
 Lake Manakiki
 Nekoosa Flowage
 Nepco Lake
 Petenwell Lake
 Port Edwards Flowage
 Quail Point Flowage
 Ross Lake (Rose)
 South Gallagher Flowage
 Wazeecha Lake
 Wisconsin Rapids Flowage

References

External links 
 Wisconsin Department of Natural Resources Find A Lake
 Wisconsin Lakes organization

Lakes
Wisconsin